= List of Olympus products =

The following is an alphabetically sorted list of products manufactured under the Olympus company brand.

== Photography ==
=== Digital cameras ===
Model Name	Maximum resolution (megapixels)	Comment/description	Release date	References
Olympus AZ-2 Zoom	4.0	2.8× optical zoom		Olympus Europe, archived from the original on 20 December 2006
C series, also referred to as Camedia C series
C-400	0.35		1996	
C-400L	0.35		1996	
C-420L	0.35		1997	
C-500L				Olympus, D-500L/D-600L Digital Cameras, archived from the original on 19 February 2009
C-600L				Olympus, D-500L/D-600L Digital Cameras, archived from the original on 19 February 2009
C-620L			1998	
C-800L	0.81	First of the CAMEDIA line.	1996	Olympus global
C-820L	0.81		1997	
C-830L	1.3		1999	
C-840L	1.3		1999	
C-860L	1.3	also known as D-360L	2000	
D 400 Zoom or C-900 Zoom	1.3	First digital camera in the compact series to feature an optical 3× zoom lens	1998	Olympus global
C-920 Zoom	1.3		2000	
C-960 Zoom	1.3			
C-990 Zoom	2.1			
C-1000L	0.85		1998	
C-1400L	1.41	Fixed-lens digital single-lens reflex camera. 3× optical zoom lens	1997	Olympus global
C-1400XL	1.41		1999	
Olympus C-2500L	2.5	Single-lens reflex camera. Progressive primary color CCD. 3× zoom lens	1999	Olympus global
Olympus C-2000 Zoom	2.11	Was a high-end compact digital camera (when it was launched). Equipped with an F2.0 large-aperture 3× zoom lens. The series evolved through the 3030 and 4040 models, which had higher CCD resolutions, and the 5060 and 8080 models, which were equipped with wide-angle zoom lenses.	Approx. 1999	Olympus global
C-2020 Zoom	2.11			
C-2040 Zoom	2.11		2000	
Olympus C-2100 UZ	2.1	10× zoom lens, Image Stabilization	2000	Olympus America, archived from the original on 2007-09-28; DCResource, archived from the original on 2013-05-01
C-211 Zoom	2.1	Was the only Olympus digital camera to features built in photo printer, it took Polaroid 500 film for printing.	2000	
C-1	1.3	Slim, compact body design. Also known as D-100.	2001	Olympus global, Olympus C-1, Цифровая камера Olympus Camedia C-1, Цифровые камеры Olympus, Цифровые камеры Olympus C-1 и Olympus C-100, archived from the original on 2006-02-03, Olympus C-1
C-1 Zoom	1.3	About 3 months after the launch of the C-1, Olympus introduced the C-1 Zoom, which has a similar body size but is equipped with a 3× zoom lens. Also known as D-150Z.	2001	Olympus global, Цифровые камеры Olympus
C-100	1.3	Also known as D-370.	2001	Olympus C-100, Цифровые камеры Olympus C-1 и Olympus C-100, archived from the original on 2006-02-03
C-2	2.0	Also known as D-230.	2001	Olympus – C-2, archived from the original on January 3, 2009
C-2 Zoom	2.0		2002	Olympus global
C-21	2.1		1999	
Olympus C-120	2.0	also known as D-380		
Olympus C-150	2.0			Olympus UK, archived from the original on 2006-09-08
Olympus C-160	3.2	also known as D-395		
Olympus C-220 Zoom	2.0	3× zoom lens	April 2002	
Olympus C-3000 Zoom	3.3	f/2.8 3× zoom lens	2000	
Olympus C-3020 Zoom	3.2	f/2.8 3× zoom lens	2001	
Olympus C-3030 Zoom	3.3	f/2.8 3× zoom lens	2000	
Olympus C-3040 Zoom	3.3	f/1.8 3× zoom lens	2001	
Olympus C-300 Zoom	3.0	2.8× optical zoom, 3.6× digital zoom, 5.8–16.2mm 1:2.9-4.4, TIFF; also known as D-550 Zoom	2003	
Olympus C-310 Zoom	3.2	3× optical zoom, 4× digital zoom, also known as Olympus Camedia D-540 Zoom	2004	
Olympus C-350 Zoom	3.2			
Olympus C-360 Zoom	3.2			
Olympus C-370 Zoom	3.2	3× optical zoom, 4× digital zoom, also known as D-535	October 2004	Olympus Europe, archived from the original on 3 December 2008
Olympus C-4000 Zoom	4.0	3× optical zoom, 3.3× digital zoom	August 2002	Olympus America, archived from the original on 1 January 2007
Olympus C-4040 Zoom	4.1	3× optical zoom, 37.5× digital zoom	August 2001	Olympus America, archived from the original on 23 October 2006
Olympus C-450 Zoom	4.0	3× optical zoom, 12× digital zoom		Olympus Europe, archived from the original on 4 November 2004
Olympus C-460 Zoom	4.0	3× optical zoom, 4× digital zoom		Olympus Europe, archived from the original on 3 December 2008
Olympus C-460 Zoom del Sol	4.0	3× optical zoom, 4× digital zoom		Olympus Europe, archived from the original on 3 December 2008
Olympus C-470 Zoom	4.0	3× optical zoom, 4× digital zoom		Olympus Europe, archived from the original on 3 December 2008
Olympus C-5000 Zoom	5.0	3× optical zoom, 4× digital zoom	2003	Olympus America, archived from the original on 17 October 2007
Olympus C-5050 Zoom	5.0	3× optical zoom, 3.4× digital zoom	October 2002	Olympus America, archived from the original on 17 August 2009
Olympus C-5060 Wide Zoom	5.1	4× optical zoom, 3.5× digital zoom	November 2003	Olympus America, archived from the original on 24 August 2007
Olympus C-5500 Sport Zoom	5.1	5× optical zoom, 4× digital zoom	February 2005	Olympus America, archived from the original on 28 December 2008
Olympus C-50 Zoom	5.0	3× optical, 4× digital zoom	October 2002	Olympus America, archived from the original on 20 February 2007
Olympus C-55 Zoom	5.1	5× optical, 4× digital zoom	February 2005	Olympus Europe, archived from the original on 30 December 2008
Olympus C-60 Zoom	6.1	3× optical zoom, 4× digital zoom	April 2004	Olympus America, archived from the original on 23 October 2006
Olympus C-70 Zoom	7.1	5× optical zoom, 6× digital zoom	October 2004	Olympus Europe, archived from the original on 30 December 2008
Olympus Camedia C-700 Ultra Zoom	2.02	Belonged to the compact Ultra Zoom series. 10× optical zoom lens	May 2001	Olympus global
Olympus C-7000 Zoom	7.1	5× optical zoom, 6× digital zoom	October 2004	Olympus America, archived from the original on 18 February 2007
Olympus C-7070 Wide Zoom	7.1	4.1× optical zoom, 5× digital zoom	February 2005	Olympus America, archived from the original on February 20, 2006
Olympus C-720 Ultra Zoom	3.0	8× optical and 3× digital zoom	June 2002	Olympus America, archived from the original on March 14, 2006
Olympus C-725 Ultra Zoom	3.0	8× optical zoom lens f2.8–3.4 with ED lens	May 2004	Olympus Europe, archived from the original on 2007-01-13; Ciao, archived from the original on 10 May 2007
Olympus C-730 Ultra Zoom	3.2	10× optical zoom, 3× digital zoom	October 2002	Olympus Europe, archived from the original on 30 December 2008
Olympus C-740 Ultra Zoom	3.2	10× optical zoom, 3× digital zoom	March 2, 2003	Olympus America, archived from the original on December 11, 2005
Olympus C-745 Ultra Zoom	3.2	10× optical zoom, 3× digital zoom, PictBridge	October 2003	
Olympus C-750 Ultra Zoom	4.0	10× optical zoom, 4× digital zoom	June 19, 2003	Olympus America, archived from the original on March 14, 2006
Olympus C-755 Ultra Zoom	4.0	10× optical zoom, 4× digital zoom, PictBridge	November 2003	Olympus America, archived from the original on March 14, 2006
Olympus C-760 Ultra Zoom	3.2	10× optical zoom, 3× digital zoom, PictBridge	February 2004	Olympus America, archived from the original on December 11, 2005
Olympus C-765 Ultra Zoom	4.0	10× optical zoom lens f2.8–3.7	April 2004	Olympus Europe, archived from the original on 27 January 2007
Olympus C-770 Ultra Zoom	4.0	10× optical zoom lens (38mm–380mm equivalent focal length), 4× digital zoom	April 2004	Olympus America, archived from the original on 23 October 2006
Olympus C-8080 Wide Zoom	8.0	5× optical zoom, 3× digital zoom	April 2004	Olympus America, archived from the original on 28 December 2008
D series
Olympus D-425	4.0	4× digital zoom	January 2005	
Olympus D-435	5.1	4× digital zoom	August 2005	Olympus America, archived from the original on 9 October 2007
Olympus D-490	2.1	Also known as C990Z, 3× optical zoom (35–105mm equiv. focal), f/2.8-f/4.4,	August 1, 2000	Olympus America, archived from the original on 2013-07-04; DPReview, archived from the original on 25 October 2007
Olympus D-535	3.2	Also known as C370, 3× optical zoom, 4× digital zoom, 12× seamless zoom capability	October 2004	Olympus America, archived from the original on 2013-07-04; Olympus UK, archived from the original on 21 August 2007
Olympus D-560	3.2	3× optical, 3.4× digital, 10× total seamless zoom		Olympus America, archived from the original on 2013-07-04;
E series
Olympus E-1	4.9	First digital SLR to use the Four Thirds System. Professional.	2003	Olympus America, archived from the original on June 6, 2007
Olympus E-3	10.1	Professional level dSLR	November 2007	Olympus America, archived from the original on 2010-01-23
Olympus E-5	12.3	Professional level dSLR	September 2010	Olympus America, September 14, 2010, archived from the original on March 16, 2012
Olympus E-10	4.0	First digital SLR	2000	Olympus America, archived from the original on 2013-10-15
Olympus E-20	5.0		2001	Olympus America, archived from the original on 2007-12-24
Olympus E-30	12.3	Intermediate Four Thirds model between the E-3 and the E-520.	January 2009	Olympus America, archived from the original on 2012-07-16
Olympus E-100RS	1.5	RS=Rapid Shot. Capable of shooting up to 15fps sequentially. Shutter speeds range from 1/10,000 to 16 sec. Designed to capture high speed motion.	November 2000	Olympus America, archived from the original on 23 March 2007
Olympus E-300	8.0	Also known as the EVOLT E-300. E-1's little brother, first SLR to use Porro prism since Minolta Vectis and Olympus Pen.	December 2004	Olympus America, archived from the original on 9 January 2007
Olympus E-330	7.4	first digital SLR with live LCD 7.4 megapixels	January 2006	Olympus America, archived from the original on 2008-02-18
Olympus E-400	10.0	World's smallest, lightest digital SLR.	October 2006	Olympus Europe, archived from the original on 2008-12-20
Olympus E-410	10.0	Compact digital SLR, successor to the E-400.	April 2007	Olympus America, archived from the original on 2009-03-17
Olympus E-420	10.0	Compact digital SLR, successor to the E-410.	May 2008	Olympus America, archived from the original on 2010-03-05
Olympus E-450	10.0	Compact digital SLR. Very similar to the E-420 with added art filters.	April 2009	Olympus UK & Ireland, archived from the original on 2009-07-26
Olympus E-500	8.0	Digital SLR	October 2006	Olympus America, archived from the original on 2005-10-13
Olympus E-510	10.0	Digital SLR with Image Stabilisation, successor to the E-500.	June 2007	Olympus America, archived from the original on 2009-03-09
Olympus E-520	10.0	Digital SLR with Image Stabilisation, successor to the E-510.	August 2008	Olympus America, archived from the original on 2008-05-17
Olympus E-620	12.0	Intermediate Four Thirds model between the E-30 and the E-520.	February 2009	Olympus America, archived from the original on 2012-09-15
FE series
Olympus FE-100	4.0	Also known as X-710, 2.8× optical zoom, 4× digital zoom	September 2005	
Olympus FE-110	5.0	Also known as X-705, 2.8× optical zoom, 4× digital zoom	September 2005	
Olympus FE-115	5.0	Also known as X-715, 2.8× optical zoom, 4× digital zoom	February 2006	
Olympus FE-120	6.0	Also known as X-700, 3× optical zoom, 4× digital zoom	September 2005	
Olympus FE-130	5.1	Also known as X-720, 3× optical zoom, 4× digital zoom	February 2006	
Olympus FE-140	6.0	Also known as X-725, 3× optical zoom, 4× digital zoom	February 2006	
Olympus FE-150	5.0	Also known as X-730, 3× optical zoom, 4× digital zoom	April 2006	
Olympus FE-160	6.0	Also known as X-735, 3× optical zoom, 4× digital zoom	March 2006	
Olympus FE-170	6.0	Also known as X-760, 3× optical zoom, 4× digital zoom	September 2006	
Olympus FE-180	6.0	Also known as X-745, 3× optical zoom, 4× digital zoom	September 2006	
Olympus FE-190	6.0	Also known as X-750, 3× optical zoom, 4× digital zoom	September 2006	
Olympus FE-20	8.0	Also known as X-15, 3× optical zoom, 4× digital zoom	September 2008	
Olympus FE-25	10.0	3× optical zoom, 4× digital zoom	February 2009	
Olympus FE-26	12.0	3× optical zoom, 4× digital zoom	August 2009	
Olympus FE-200	6.0	3× optical zoom, 4× digital zoom	September 2006	
Olympus FE-210	7.1	3× optical zoom, 4× digital zoom	February 2007	
Olympus FE-220	7.1	3× optical zoom, 4× digital zoom	February 2007	
Olympus FE-230	7.1	3× optical zoom, 4× digital zoom	February 2007	
Olympus FE-240	7.1	5× optical zoom, 4× digital zoom	February 2007	
Olympus FE-250	8.0	3× optical zoom, 4× digital zoom	February 2007	
Olympus FE-270	7.1	3× optical zoom, 4× digital zoom	September 2007	
Olympus FE-280	8.0	Also known as X-820 and C-520. 3× optical zoom, 4× digital zoom	September 2007	
Olympus FE-290	7.1	4× optical zoom, 4× digital zoom	September 2007	
Olympus FE-300	12.0	3× optical zoom, 4× digital zoom	September 2007	
Olympus FE-3000	10.0	3× optical zoom, 4× digital zoom	January 2009	
Olympus FE-3010	12.0	3× optical zoom, 4× digital zoom	March 2009	
Olympus FE-310	8.0	5× optical zoom, 4× digital zoom	February 2008	
Olympus FE-320	8.0	3× optical zoom, 4× digital zoom	February 2008	
Olympus FE-340	8.0	5× optical zoom, 4× digital zoom	February 2008	Olympus America, archived from the original on 30 October 2010 and Imaging Resource Review: Olympus FE-340
Olympus FE-350	8.0	4× optical zoom, 4× digital zoom	February 2008	
Olympus FE-360	8.0	3× optical zoom, 4× digital zoom	September 2008	
Olympus FE-370	8.0	5× optical zoom, 4× digital zoom	September 2008	
Olympus FE-4000	12.0	4× optical zoom, 4× digital zoom.	August 2009	Olympus America, archived from the original on 13 January 2010
Olympus FE-4010	12.0	4× optical zoom, 4× digital zoom.	August 2009	Olympus America, archived from the original on 13 January 2010
Olympus FE-4020	14.0	4× optical zoom, 4× digital zoom.	February 2010	Olympus America, archived from the original on 15 January 2010
Olympus FE-4030	14.0	4× optical zoom, 4× digital zoom.	March 2010	Olympus Europe, archived from the original on 12 January 2010
Olympus FE-4040	14.0	4× optical zoom, 4× digital zoom.	March 2010	Olympus Europe
Olympus FE-45	10.0	3× optical zoom, 4× digital zoom	January 2009	Olympus America, archived from the original on 4 January 2010
Olympus FE-46	12.0	5× optical zoom, 4× digital zoom. Also known as the X-42	July 2009	Olympus America, archived from the original on 13 January 2010
Olympus FE-47	14.0	5× optical zoom, 4× digital zoom.	January 2010	Olympus America, archived from the original on 14 January 2010
Olympus FE-5000	10.1	5× optical zoom, 4× digital zoom	January 2009	Olympus Europe, archived from the original on 25 January 2010
Olympus FE-5010	12.0	5× optical zoom, 4× digital zoom	January 2009	Olympus America, archived from the original on 29 January 2010
Olympus FE-5020	12.0	5× optical zoom, 4× digital zoom	August 2009	Olympus Europe, archived from the original on 24 January 2010
Olympus FE-5030	14.0	5× optical zoom, 4× digital zoom	March 2010	Olympus Europe, archived from the original on 12 January 2010
PEN series
Olympus PEN E-P1	12.3	Olympus' first camera using the Micro Four Thirds system.	July 2009	Olympus America, archived from the original on June 19, 2009
Olympus PEN E-P2	12.3	An upgrade to the PEN E-P1.	November 2009	Olympus America, November 5, 2009
Olympus PEN E-P3				
Olympus PEN E-P5				
Olympus PEN E-P7	20.3	The last camera released before OM digital solutions changed camera name from Olympus to OM System	25 June 2021	
Olympus PEN E-PL1	12.3	A Micro Four Thirds camera geared toward consumers moving up from point-and-shoot cameras.	February 2010	Olympus America, February 3, 2010, archived from the original on June 6, 2011
Olympus PEN E-PL2	12.3	An upgrade to the PEN E-PL1.	January 2011	Olympus America, January 5, 2011, archived from the original on January 10, 2011
Olympus PEN E-PL3			June 30, 2011	
Olympus PEN E-PL5			September 17, 2012	
Olympus PEN E-PL6			May 10, 2013	
Olympus PEN E-PL7			August 28, 2014	
Olympus PEN E-PL8			September 19, 2016	
Olympus PEN E-PL9			April 5, 2018	
Olympus PEN E-PL10			November 20, 2019	
Olympus PEN E-PM1			June 30, 2011	
Olympus PEN E-PM2			September 17, 2012	
Olympus PEN-F			January 2016	
Stylus series, also known as the μ or MJU series
Olympus Stylus 1	12	DSLR-styled super-zoom camera with a 10.7× range, constant f2.8 aperture, built-in viewfinder and a larger sensor than most rivals	25 November 2013	
Olympus Stylus 1s	12	An upgrade to the Stylus 1	13 April 2015	
Olympus Stylus 300	3.2	Also known as μ300	February 2003	
Olympus Stylus 400	4.0	Also known as μ400	April 2003	
Olympus Stylus 410	4.0	Also known as μ410D, 3× optical, 4× digital	February 2004	
Olympus Stylus 500	5.0	Also known as μ500	January 2005	
Olympus Stylus 550WP	10.0	Also known as μ550WP	February 2009	
Olympus Stylus 600	6.0	Also known as μ600	September 2005	
Olympus Stylus 7000	12.0	Also known as μ7000	February 2009	
Olympus Stylus 710	7.1	Also known as μ700	March 2006	
Olympus Stylus 720SW	7.1	Also known as μ720, 3× optical zoom, underwater	March 2006	
Olympus Stylus 725 SW	7.1	Also known as μ725, 3× optical zoom, underwater	October 2006	
Olympus Stylus 730	7.1	Also known as μ730	October 2006	
Olympus Stylus 740	7.1	Also known as μ740, 5× optical zoom	September 2006	
Olympus Stylus 750	7.1	Also known as μ750, 5× optical zoom	September 2006	
Olympus Stylus 760	7.1	Also known as μ760	March 2007	
Olympus Stylus 770SW	7.1	Also known as μ770SW	March 2007	
Olympus Stylus 780	7.1	Also known as μ780	April 2007	
Olympus Stylus 790SW	7.1	Also known as μ790SW	September 2007	
Olympus Stylus 800	8.0	Also known as μ800	July 2005	
Olympus Stylus 810	8.0	Also known as μ810	March 2006	
Olympus Stylus 820	8.0	Also known as μ820	September 2007	
Olympus Stylus 830	8.0	Also known as μ830	October 2007	
Olympus Stylus 850SW	8.0	Also known as μ850SW	January 2008	
Olympus Stylus 9000	12.0	Also known as μ9000	February 2009	
Olympus Stylus 1000	10.0	Also known as μ1000	October 2006	
Olympus Stylus 1030SW	10.1	Also known as μ1030SW	March 2008	
Olympus Stylus 1040	10.0	Also known as μ1040	September 2008	
Olympus Stylus 1050SW	10.1	Also known as μ1050SW	September 2008	
Olympus Stylus 1060	10.0	Also known as μ1060	September 2008	
Olympus Stylus 1200	12.0	Also known as μ1200	October 2007	
Olympus Stylus SP-100EE	15.9	50× optical zoom, 4× digital zoom	March 2014	Olympus Digitalkameras (2006–2014) (in German)
Olympus Stylus SP-820 Ultra Zoom	14.0	40× optical zoom, 4× digital zoom	October 2012	Olympus Digitalkameras (2006–2014) (in German)
Olympus Stylus Verve	4.0	Also known as μ-mini Digital	October 2004	
Olympus Stylus Verve S	5.0	Also known as μ-mini Digital S	April 2005	DPReview
SP series
Olympus SP-350	8.0	3× optical zoom, 5× digital zoom	2005	Olympus Product Archive, archived from the original on 2007-08-08
Olympus SP-500 Ultra Zoom	6.0	10× optical zoom, 5× digital zoom	2005	
Olympus SP-510 Ultra Zoom	7.1	10× optical zoom, 5× digital zoom	2006	
Olympus SP-550 Ultra Zoom	7.1	18× optical zoom, 5.6× digital zoom	February 2007	Olympus America, archived from the original on 21 March 2007 Scared of the Dark, archived from the original on 2007-03-24
Olympus SP-560 Ultra Zoom	8.0	18× optical zoom, 5.6× digital zoom	October 2007	
Olympus SP-570 Ultra Zoom	10.0	20× optical zoom, 5× digital zoom	February 2008	Olympus America, archived from the original on 1 February 2008
Olympus SP-565 Ultra Zoom	10.0	20× optical zoom, 5× digital zoom	October 2008	
Olympus SP-590 Ultra Zoom	12.0	26× optical zoom, 5× digital zoom	March 2009	
Olympus SP-600 Ultra Zoom	12.0	15× optical zoom, 5× digital zoom	2010	
Olympus SP-620 Ultra Zoom	15.9	21× optical zoom, 4× digital zoom	February 2012	Olympus Digitalkameras (2006–2014) (in German)
Olympus SP-720 Ultra Zoom	14.0	26× optical zoom	August 2012	
Olympus SP-800 Ultra Zoom	14.0	30× optical zoom, 5× digital zoom	2010	
Olympus SP-810 Ultra Zoom	14.0	36× optical zoom, 4× digital zoom	September 2011	
Tough series
Olympus Stylus Tough-6000	10.0	Also known as μ	January 2009	
Olympus Stylus Tough-8000	12.0	Also known as μ	February 2009	
Olympus Tough TG-850	16.0 BSI-CMOS			Has tilt-angle screen that can flip up to face forward for selfies or waist-level work (no other waterproof compact cameras have featured it). 21-105mm, the widest among waterproof cameras. TruePic VII processing engine, and speedy 7.1 frames per second burst shooting. Dual image stabilization: sensor-shift image stabilization system, high ISO sensitivity, fast focus in a blink of an eye. Full HD 60p. Time lapse. 30 feet or 10 meters underwater capability.
Olympus Tough TG-860	16.0 BSI-CMOS			Near identical with TG-850 with additional WiFi and GPS and also improvement to 50 feet or 15 meters underwater capability. Sportcam mode to compete with action cameras. New programmable function button on the front of the camera, and the movie record button on the back is now programmable, allowing quicker access to important functions.
Olympus Tough TG-1 iHS	12.0		May 2012	Olympus Tough TG-1 iHS was a high-end rugged, waterproof compact camera with 25-100mm equivalent F2.0-4.9 zoom lens. The TG-1 is tougher than previous Tough models, being waterproof to 12 m (40 ft) and shockproof from a height of 2 m (6.6 ft) and had optional waterproof fisheye and telephoto converter lenses. The TG-1 iHS was built around a 1/2.3"-type 12MP back-lit CMOS sensor and a TruePic VI processor to make the most of its output.
Olympus Tough TG-2 iHS	12.0		January 2013	Olympus Tough TG-2 iHS was an update from the previous Tough TG-1, waterproof to 15m.
Olympus Tough TG-3	16.0		March 2014	Recommended by National Geographic, waterproof up to 50 feet, f/2 25-100mm, 3" OLED display, time lapse, built-in GPS and WiFi
Olympus Tough TG-4	16.0		2015	The Tough TG-4 is a significant upgrade over its predecessor with the addition of Raw support. Olympus' cool 'Live Composite mode', a pair of custom setting spots on the mode dial, and additional underwater modes are also new features.
Olympus Tough TG-5	12.0		2017	Olympus Tough TG-5 is the upgrade from TG-4 but with less megapixels.
Olympus Tough TG-6	12.0		22 May 2019	Olympus Tough TG-6 has higher resolution LCD, additional macro and underwater modes, and focus bracketing than previous model. Improvements have also been made to reduce ghosting and flare.
OM System Tough TG-7	12.0		13 September 2023	OM System Tough TG-7 is with identical specification of the Olympus Tough TG-6 and OM System rebranding over Olympus.
OM-D series
Olympus OM-D E-M1	16.0	Micro Four Thirds lens system, 5-axis image stabilisation	September 2013	4 f/stop stabilization compensation, full resolution 10fps/9fps-AF, Full HD 1080/30p, Max bitrate 24 Mbit/s
Olympus OM-D E-M5	16.0	Micro Four Thirds lens system, 5-axis image stabilisation	February 2012	4 f/stop stabilization compensation, full resolution 9fps/3.5fps-AF, Full HD 1080/30p, Max bitrate 17 Mbit/s
Olympus OM-D E-M10	16.0	Micro Four Thirds lens system, 3-axis image stabilisation	January 2014	
Olympus OM-D E-M5 Mark II	16.0	Micro Four Thirds lens system, 5-axis image stabilisation	February 2015	5 f/stop stabilization compensation, full resolution 10fps/5fps-AF, Full HD 1080/60p, Max bitrate 77 Mbit/s, can take 64MP RAW (40MP JPEG) superresolution images of non-moving subjects
Olympus OM-D E-M10 Mark II	16.0	Micro Four Thirds lens system, 5-axis image stabilisation	August 2015	
Olympus OM-D E-M1 Mark II	20.4	Micro Four Thirds lens system, 5-axis image stabilisation	September 2016	5.5 f/stop stabilization compensation, full resolution 60fps/18fps-AF, 4K video, Max bitrate 24 Mbit/s, 50 MP High Res shot mode (uses sensor shift during an 8-frame sequence, combining the files into one), Pro Capture mode (starts capturing shots upon half-pressing the shutter, retaining last 14 shots leading up to full shutter actuation)
Olympus OM-D E-M10 Mark III	16.0	Micro Four Thirds lens system, 5-axis image stabilisation	August 2017	Full resolution 8.6 fps-AF, 4K video, Max bitrate 24 Mbit/s
Olympus OM-D E-M1X	20.4	Micro Four Thirds lens system, 5-axis image stabilisation, integrated battery grip	January 2019	7 f/stop stabilization compensation; IPX1 water resistance; USB-C power delivery; full resolution 60fps/18fps-AF, 4K video, max bitrate up to 237 Mbit/s; 60 fps full HD video; 80 MP High Res shot mode; Pro Capture mode (35-frame buffer); Live ND (combines multiple exposures to simulate effect of neutral-density filter of up to 5 stops)
Olympus OM-D E-M5 Mark III	20.4	Micro Four Thirds lens system, 5-axis image stabilization	December 2019	Upgraded to 20 Mp sensor, and change from previous model with polycarbonate body instead of metal body.
Olympus OM-D E-M1 Mark III	20.4	Micro Four Thirds lens system, 5-axis image stabilization	2020	Minor upgrade with new Truepic IX processor and Starry Sky mode.
Olympus OM-D E-M10 Mark IV	20.4	Micro Four Thirds lens system, 5-axis image stabilization	September 2020	Upgrade to 20 Megapixel sensor.
Olympus OM-D E-M10 Mark IIIs	16	Micro Four Thirds lens system, 5-axis image stabilization	17 November 2020	The OM-D E-M10 Mark IIIs is upgraded from the E-M10 Mark III with a new silent shooting mode and a new 'Instant Film' art filter mode.
OM System OM-1	20.4	Micro Four Thirds lens system, 5-axis image stabilization	2022	Pro level camera. First OMDS camera released with the brand OM System and stacked sensor. Also the last camera with the name Olympus printed on it and first IP53-rated weather-sealed camera.
OM System OM-5	20.4	Micro Four Thirds lens system, 5-axis image stabilization	17 November 2022	The first camera from OM Digital Solutions without the name Olympus. World's first mid range Mirrorless IP53-rated weather-sealed camera.
Other
Olympus Ferrari Digital Model 2004	3.2	3× optical zoom, 1× – 2.7× digital zoom	July 2004	Olympus Europe, archived from the original on 20 August 2009
Olympus IR-300	5.0	3× optical zoom, 4× digital zoom	2005	Olympus Europe, archived from the original on 21 September 2011
Olympus IR-500	4.0	2.8× optical zoom, 11× digital zoom	2004	Olympus Europe, archived from the original on 21 September 2011

=== Film cameras ===
Model Name	Production span	Description	References
Early cameras
Semi Olympus	1936–1937	4.5×6 cm folder camera. The first camera released by Olympus.The body is a copy of the German Baldax large model and it is the same as the body of the prewar Semi Proud camera.	
Semi Olympus II	October 1937 – March 1940	4.5×6 cm folder camera.	
Standard	1937 (never officially sold)	4x5 cm medium format camera, only made as ten prototypes before project was abandoned. At least two out of the ten cameras made, were sold.	
Six series
Chrome Six I	1948	The successor to the Olympus Six but with wholly diecast construction. It has the same four element 7.5 cm f/3.5 Zuiko lens as the predecessor.	
Chrome Six II	1948	Same as the Olympus Chrome Six I, but with 7.5 cm f/2.8 Zuiko lens.	
Chrome Six III	1952 (probably not 1951 as sometimes stated)	As the Olympus Chrome Six I and II, but a new "film plane corrector". Sold with two different lens choices, Zuiko 7.5 cm f/2.8 or f/3.5.	
Chrome Six IVa	1954	New top housing, containing an uncoupled rangefinder. Zuiko 7.5 cm f/3.5.	
Chrome Six IVb	1954	New top housing, containing an uncoupled rangefinder. Zuiko 7.5 cm f/2.8.	
Chrome Six V (also named Six V)	1955	Two versions. Six VA has the D.Zuiko F.C. f/3.5 lens and the VB has the Zuiko F.C. f/2.8.	
Chrome Six V RII (also named Six V RII)	1955	Rangefinder version of SixV. Two versions. A version has the D.Zuiko F.C. f/3.5 lens and the B version the has Zuiko F.C. f/2.8	
Six (also named Six I)	1940	First Dual-format folding camera in the Six series, taking 6×6 cm and 4.5×6 cm pictures. Contains four element 7.5 cm f/4.5 Zuiko lens	
Six II	Late 1940 or 1941	As the Olympus Six camera but with four element 7.5 cm f/3.5 lens	
Super Olympus	1943	An Olympus Six camera but with new five element 7.5 cm f/4.5 lens	
Super Olympus II	1943	As the Super Olympus I camera but with five element 7.5 cm f/3.5 lens	
Flex series (6x6 TLR cameras)
Flex (later renamed Flex BII)	1952	First of the series of 6×6 TLRs	
Flex A (or Flex AI, Flex A3.5)	1955		
Flex A2.8	December 1955		
Flex A3.5II	September 1956		
35 series
35 I	1948		
35 II	1949		
35 III	1949		
35 IV	1949		
35 IVa	1953		
35 IVb	1954		
35 Va	1955		
35 Vb	1955		
35 S	1955	Compact rangefinder. Lens D. Zuiko 45mm f/3.5 in earlier cameras, E.Zuiko 4.8 cm f/2.8 or G. Zuiko 45mm f/1.9 in later cameras.	
35 S II	1957	Updated version. Three different lenses were available : E. Zuiko 48mm f/2.8, G. Zuiko 4.2 cm f/2.0 and G. Zuiko 4.2 cm f/1.8.	
35 Wide S	1957	35mm F/2 coated H. Zuiko-W, 8 element in 6 group design.	
Olympus-S Electro Set	1962–1963	Rangefinder camera with 4.2 cm G-Zuiko f/1.8. Selenium meter.	
Olympus-SC	1963–1965	Rangefinder camera with 4.2 cm G-Zuiko f/1.8. Cadmium disulfide meter.	
35 LE	1966 (or 1965)		
35 LC	1967		
Olympus 35SP	1969	Only telemetric ever with spot metering; fixed lens 42 mm, f/1.7	
Olympus 35RC	1970	Small rangefinder camera	
35 DC	1971		
35 EC	1971		
35 EC2	1971		
35 ECR	1972		
35 SPN	1972		
35 UC	1973		
35 DC	1974		
35 ED	1974		
Olympus 35RD	1975	Small rangefinder camera, fixed 40mm f/1.7 lens	
Olympus AZ-4 zoom	approx. 1989	Early Bridge camera, 35–135 mm zoom	
Ace series
Ace	1958–1960	Olympus first and only rangefinder camera series with interchangeable lenses	
Ace E	1959–1961	Restyled top cover and selenium meter. The camera was also sold as Sears Tower 19.	
AF series, also known as Infinity series
AF-1	1986	Earned the nickname "Nurepika" ("Wet Flash"). Was the world's first weatherproof fully automatic compact camera.	Olympus global
AF-1 QD	1987		
AF-10	1987		
AF-10 Data	1987		
AF-1 Super			
AF-1 Super Data			
AF-1 Twin			
AF-1 Twin QD			
AF-10 Super			
AF-10 Super QD			
AF-10 Twin			
AF-10 Twin QD			
AF-1 Mini			
AF-1 Mini QD			
AF-10 Mini	1995		
AF-10 XB	1998		
iS series, also known as L series (mostly in Japan)
iS-1000	1990	Also known as iS-1 in the United States and L-1 in Japan	
iS-1000 QD			
iS-2000	1991	Also known as iS-2 in the United States and L-2 in Japan	
iS-2000 QD / DLX			
iS-3000	1992	Also known as iS-3 in the United States and L-3 in Japan	
iS-3000 QD			
iS-100	1994	Also known as iS-10 in the United States and L-10 in Japan	
iS-100 QD			
iS-100S	1996	Also known as iS-10S in the United States and L-10S in Japan	
iS-100S QD			
iS-200	1997	Also known as iS-20 in the United States and L-20 in Japan	
iS-200 QD			
iS-300	1999	Also known as iS-30 in the United States and L-30 in Japan	
iS-300 QD	1999		
iS-5			
iS-50 QD			
i-Zoom series
i-Zoom 75	1998		
i-Zoom 60	1999		
i-Zoom 2000	2000		
i-Zoom 3000			
mju series, also known as Stylus/Stylus Epic series
Olympus mju I / Stylus	1991		
mju-I QD			
mju-I Limited			
mju-I Panorama			
mju-I Panorama QD			
mju-Zoom 70			
mju-Zoom 70 QD			
Olympus mju II / Stylus Epic	1996–present		
mju-II QD			
mju-Zoom 105			
mju-Zoom 105 QD			
mju-Zoom 115			
mju-Zoom 115 QD			
mju-Zoom 140			
mju-Zoom 140 QD	1998		
mju-II Limited	1998		
mju-Zoom Wide 80	1998		
mju-Zoom Wide 80 QD	1998		
mju-II Zoom 80	2000		
mju-II Zoom 80 QD	2000		
Olympus mju III wide 100	approx. 2002	Compact camera with 28–100 mm zoom	
Olympus mju V Metal	2003		
Newpic series
Newpic 100	1998		
Newpic 200	1998		
Newpic Zoom 600	1998		
Newpic Zoom 90	1998		
Newpic M10 Macro	1999		
Newpic XB AF	1999		
NewpicXB FF	1999		
OM series
Olympus M-1	1972	1st 5000 ex. only	
Olympus OM-1	1973	No winder / motor coupling	
Olympus OM-1 MD	1974–1979	Motor Drive coupling	
Olympus OM-1n	1979–1987	Flash Ready LED	
Olympus OM-10	1979–1987	1st "consumer grade" OM	
Olympus OM-10 Quartz	1984–1987		
Olympus OM-2	1975–1979	aperture priority, ttl flash, OTF metering	
Olympus OM-2n	1979–1984		
Olympus OM-2 spot/program	1984–1988	Full auto, spot metering	
Olympus OM-3	1983–1986	Mechanical, cumulative 8 spots metering	
Olympus OM-4	1983–1987	aperture priority, 8 spots metering	
Olympus OM-20 (us. OM-G)	1983–1987		
Olympus OM-30 (us. OM-F)	1983–1987	Focus sensor	
Olympus OM-40 (us. OM-PC)	1985–1987	Stripped down OM-2SP w/o spot, but fully automatic	
Olympus OM-707 (us. OM77AF)	1986–1991	Auto focus with PF lens	
Olympus OM-4ti	1987–2002		
Olympus OM-101 (us. OM88)	1988–1991	"Power" focus with PF lens	
Olympus OM-3ti	1995–2002		
Olympus OM-2000	1998–2002	Cosina made, fully mechanical + spot	
PEN series
PEN	1959		
PEN S 2.8	1960		
PEN W	1964		
PEN S 3.5	1965		
PEN D series
PEN D	1962		
PEN D-2	1964		
PEN D-3	1965		
PEN EE ("Electric Eye") series
PEN EE	1961		
PEN EE-S	1962		
PEN EM	1965		
PEN Rapid EE-D	1965		
PEN Rapid EE-S	1965		
PEN EE-EL	1966		
PEN EES-EL	1966		
PEN EE-D	1967		
PEN EE-S2	1968		
PEN EE-2	1968		
PEN EE-3	1973		
PEN EF	1981		
PEN F series
PEN F	1963		
PEN FT	1966		
PEN FT Black	1966		
PEN FV	1967		
PEN F Microscope	1966		
PEN FT Microscope	1967		
Superzoom series, also known as Accura series (mostly in the United States)
Superzoom 70	1993		
Superzoom 80 Wide	1994		
Superzoom 80 Wide QD			
Superzoom 110			
Superzoom 110 QD			
Superzoom 70 QD			
Superzoom 120			
Superzoom 120 QD			
Superzoom 120 TC			
Superzoom 105			
Superzoom 800	1996		
Superzoom 800 QD	1996		
Superzoom 700 BF	1997		
Superzoom 105R	1999		
Superzoom 115	1999		
Superzoom 140S	1999		
Superzoom 140S QD	1999		
Superzoom 700 XB	1999		
Superzoom 700 XB QD	1999		
Superzoom 800S	1999		
Superzoom 800S QD	1999		
Superzoom 115 QD	1999		
Superzoom 130S	1999		
Superzoom 130S QD	1999		
Trip series
Olympus Trip 35	1967		
Trip AF	1984		
Trip AF MD	1986		
Supertrip	1986		
Trip MD	1987		
Trip AF Super			
Trip MD2			
Trip AF S-2	1992		
Trip Panorama			
Trip 100			
Trip AF Mini			
Trip AF-1 Mini			
Trip AF-1 Mini QD			
Trip AF-20			
Trip 300			
Trip AF-30			
Trip MD3			
Trip XB-40 AF	2000		
Trip XB-41 AF	2000		
Trip XB 400	2000		
XA series
Olympus XA	1979–1985	Small rangefinder camera	
XA-1			
XA-2			
XA-3			
XA-4 Macro			
Other
Infinity S	1988	Nearly identical to AM-100. Lacks date stamp. Same three zone focus.	
AM-100	1987		
C-AF	1981	First Olympus camera with Auto Focus (Infra Red controlled) and also the first with built-in flash.	
Ecru	1991	Limited edition design model	
FTL	1970	an SLR	
O Product	1986	Limited edition camera of 20,000 units worldwide with an aluminum finish	Olympus global

=== Lenses ===
Model Name	Release Date	Description	References
Olympus Zuiko Digital 14–54mm II	2008–11	Contrast auto-focus, closer focusing	Ragnarsson, Jón (2008-11-03). "Olympus E-30 officially launched". Archived from the original on 2008-12-23.
OM Zuiko 50mm f/1.2	1970s	Manual Focus	MIR Web Development Team. (2000). "Zuiko Standard 50/55mm lenses / Part II".
OM Zuiko 50mm f/1.4	1970s	Manual Focus	MIR Web Development Team. (2000). "Zuiko Standard 50/55mm lenses / Part II".
OM Zuiko 50mm f/1.8	1970s	Manual Focus	MIR Web Development Team. (2000). "Zuiko Standard 50/55mm lenses / Part II".
OM Zuiko 50mm f/3.5 Macro	1970s	Manual Focus	MIR Web Development Team. (2000). "Macro Photography with Zuiko lenses — Part 3".
OM Zuiko 50mm f/2 Macro	1970s	Manual Focus	MIR Web Development Team. (2000). "Zuiko Standard Lenses — 50mm lenses/Part III — the Macro Lens".
OM Zuiko 85mm f/2 Macro	1970s	Manual Focus	MIR Web Development Team. (2000). "Zuiko Telephoto Lenses — 85mm f/2.0".
OM Zuiko 100mm f/2	1970s	Manual Focus	MIR Web Development Team. (2000). "Zuiko Telephoto lenses — 100mm f/2.0 & 100mm f/2.8 — Part One".
OM Zuiko 100mm f/2.8	1970s	Manual Focus	MIR Web Development Team. (2000). "Zuiko Telephoto lenses — 100mm f/2.0 & 100mm f/2.8 — Part One".
OM Zuiko 135mm f/2.8	1970s	Manual Focus	MIR Web Development Team. (2000). "Zuiko Telephoto lenses at 135mm — 135mm f/2.8, 135mm f/3.5 — Part I".
OM Zuiko 135mm f/3.5	1970s	Manual Focus	MIR Web Development Team. (2000). "Zuiko Telephoto lenses at 135mm — 135mm f/2.8, 135mm f/3.5 — Part I".

== Voice Recorders ==
=== Digital Voice Recorders ===
Model Name	Release Date	Description	References
Olympus V90
Olympus VN-3100PC
Olympus VN-2100PC
Olympus DM-20
Olympus DM-10
olympus DS-150
Olympus DS-330
Olympus DS-660
Olympus DS-2000
Olympus DS-2200
Olympus DS-3000
Olympus DS-4000
Olympus DW90
Olympus VN-120
Olympus VN-240
Olympus VN-240PC
Olympus VN-3100
Olympus VN-480PC
Olympus VN-5200PC
Olympus VN-8500PC
Olympus VN-960PC
Olympus W-20
Olympus LS-10		PCM Recorder	
Olympus LS-11		PCM Recorder	
Olympus LS-5		PCM Recorder (released only in Europe)	
Olympus LS-100		Olympus LS-7	

=== Microcassetten Diktiergeräte ===
Model Name	Release Date	Description	References
Olympus Zuiko	1969	Pearlcorder	
Olympus SD	1977	Pearlcorder	
Olympus SD2	1980	Pearlcorder	
Olympus SD3	1984	Pearlcorder	
Olympus D110	1980	Pearlcorder	
Olympus D120	1984	Pearlcorder	
Olympus D130	1988	Pearlcorder	
Olympus J300	mid-1990s	Pearlcorder	One of last models, produced up to late 2000s
Olympus J500	mid-1990s	Pearlcorder	One of last models, produced up to late 2000s
Olympus S			
Olympus S701	mid-1990s	Pearlcorder	One of last models, produced up to late 2000s
Olympus S701C		Pearlcorder	
Olympus S711	mid-1990s	Pearlcorder	One of last models, produced up to late 2000s
Olympus S713	mid-1990s	Pearlcorder	One of last models, produced up to late 2000s
Olympus S723	mid-1990s	Pearlcorder	
Olympus S725	mid-1990s	Pearlcorder	
Olympus S830	2001?	Pearlcorder	
Olympus S831	2001?	Pearlcorder	

=== Minicassette Voice Recorders ===
Model Name	Release Date	Description	References
Olympus H250			
Olympus H350			
Olympus R905			

== Digital audio players ==
Model Name	Release Date	Description	References
Olympus m:Robe MR-100			
Olympus m:Robe MR-500			

== Software ==
Olympus also sold CAMEDIA Master 4.x which was a photo editor.

== See also ==
- Timeline of Olympus creative digital cameras
- Olympus OM system
