= C120 =

C120 or C-120 may refer to:

- 120 minute Compact Cassette, an audio cassette with 60 minutes recording time on each side
- Olympus C-120, a late-1990s digital camera

== See also ==
- Fairchild XC-120 Packplane
