= S830 =

S830 may refer to:

- Canon S830D, a Canon S Series digital camera
- Olympus S830, a microcassette voice recorder
