= Olympus Camedia C-700 Ultra Zoom =

Camedia C-700 Ultra Zoom
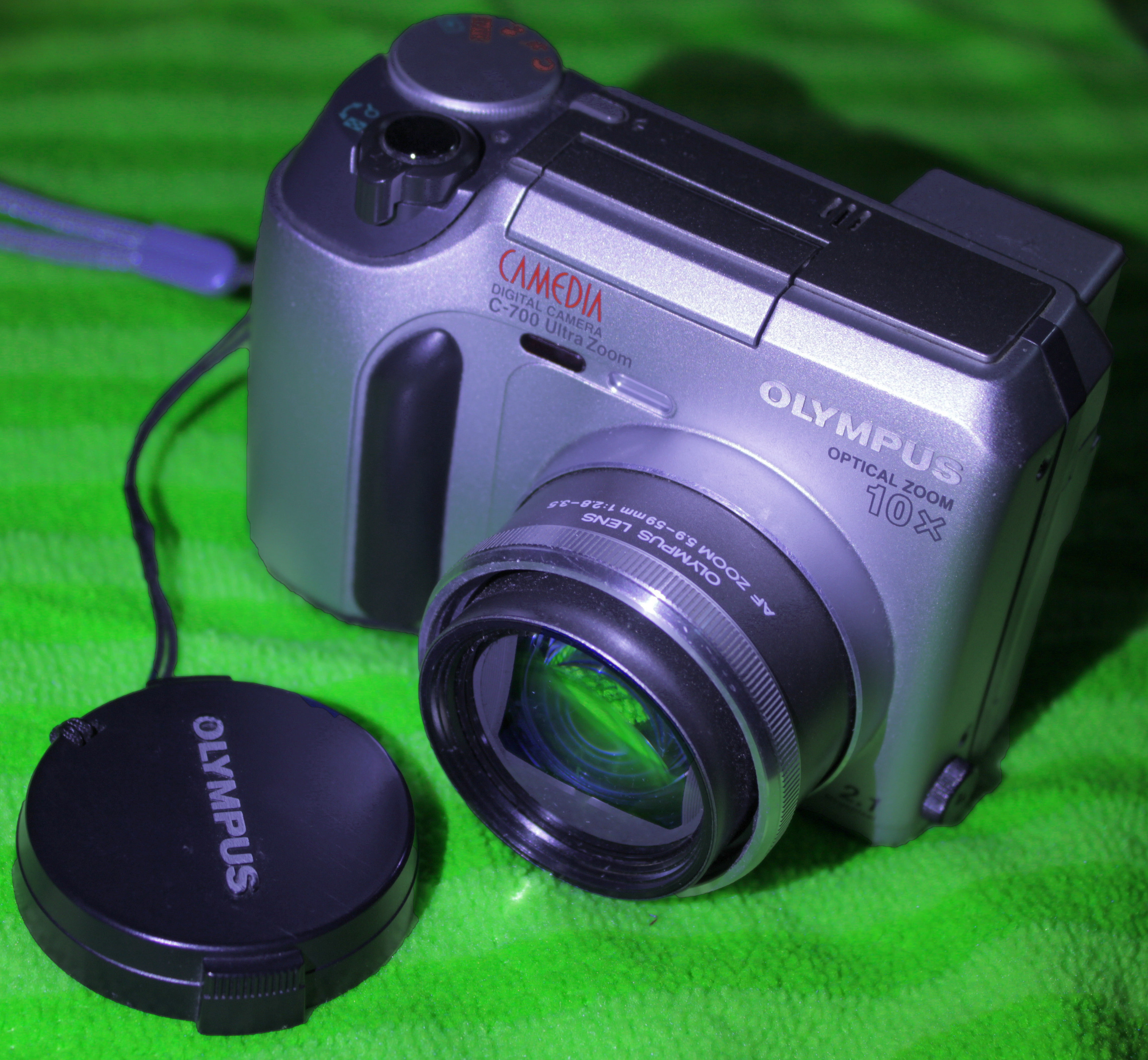

Overview
- Maker: Olympus Optical Co., Ltd.
- Type: Still image camera with motion capability

Lens
- Lens: Permanently attached 10× zoom lens
- F-numbers: f/2.8 (Wide) f/3.5 (Tele) to f/8

Sensor/medium
- Sensor type: 0.37 in (9.4 mm) digital CCD
- Sensor size: 2.02 effective megapixels
- Recording medium: 3.3V SmartMedia Card, removable

Focusing
- Focus: Automatic, Manual

Shutter
- Shutter speeds: 16 to 1/1000 s

The Olympus Camedia C-700 Ultra Zoom is a digital camera manufactured by Olympus. It was first released in May 2001 and was manufactured in Korea.

== Features and lens ==
The "Ultra Zoom" in the camera's name refers to its unusually wide 10:1 zoom range, being a significant increase over the more typical 3:1 zoom range of contemporary standard digital cameras.

The lens is an Olympus aspherical glass zoom lens, 5.9 mm to 59 mm focal length, f/2.8 to f/3.5 aperture, 10 elements in 7 groups. The 10× zoom is equivalent to 38–380 mm in 35 mm film photography. The working range of the lens is 23 inches (0.58 m) to infinity in standard mode, 4 inches (0.10 m) to 23 inches (0.58 m) in macro mode.

The Camedia C-700 offers 1-2.7× seamless digital zoom. Combined with the optical zoom, the total zoom range is 27:1.

Removable image storage is provided by a 3.3V SmartMedia Card, in capacities of 8, 16, 32, 64 or 128 megabytes. Non-Olympus memory cards must be formatted in the camera.

The camera is equipped with an Olympus exclusive miniature 4-contact USB jack. The included USB accessory cable plugs into a standard USB-A jack on a computer. A driver is needed to connect to Microsoft Windows 98 SE for image transfer, but Windows 2000 and later, as well as most Linux and Apple Mac OS X systems automatically recognize the camera as an external hard drive.

A standard UNC 1/4-20 tripod thread is provided on the bottom of the camera body. An electronic self-timer is built in, and a flashing red light-emitting diode (LED) on the front of the camera indicates automatic shutter status. An audio beep can be selectively activated or muted to provide shutter feedback to the user.

== Flash ==
The camera has a built-in manual pop-up flash. The flash operates in automatic, red-eye, forced and slow synchronization modes. A 5-pin jack for an external flash cable is provided, but there is no hot shoe flash connector.

== Still images ==
Still images are stored in lossless, uncompressed TIFF (.tif) format, or lossy JPEG (.jpg) format. The camera supports pixel resolutions of 640x480, 1024x768, 1280x960 and 1600x1200.

== Movies ==
Movies can be recorded with sound and the recording time is dependent on the memory card capacity. They are in QuickTime (.mov) format. There is a built-in microphone on top of the camera, but there is no provision for an external microphone.

== Power sources ==
The camera can use four (4) AA alkaline primary cells, four nickel-cadmium (NiCd) AA rechargeable cells, or four nickel-metal hydride (NiMH) AA rechargeable cells so that, in the end, two 3 V series-connections will supply the device (given that each cell provides approximately 1.5 V). Alternatively, it also takes two LB-01 (CR-V3) lithium cells. It is provided with a jack for an external AC power adapter, supplying 5.0 to 6.5 volts DC (6.0 volts nominal) to the camera.
