= Olympus IR-500 =

The Olympus IR-500 is a 4.0-megapixel ultra-compact digital camera introduced by Olympus Corporation in 2004.

It features a 360° swivelling 2.5" LCD, a 2.8× zoom lens, and 11× digital zoom in an ultra-compact mixed metal and plastic body. The peculiar disposition of the display allows for an enhanced hip-height photo composition (to picture children or low height objects) and auto-portrait mode (allowing the photographer to see the composition).

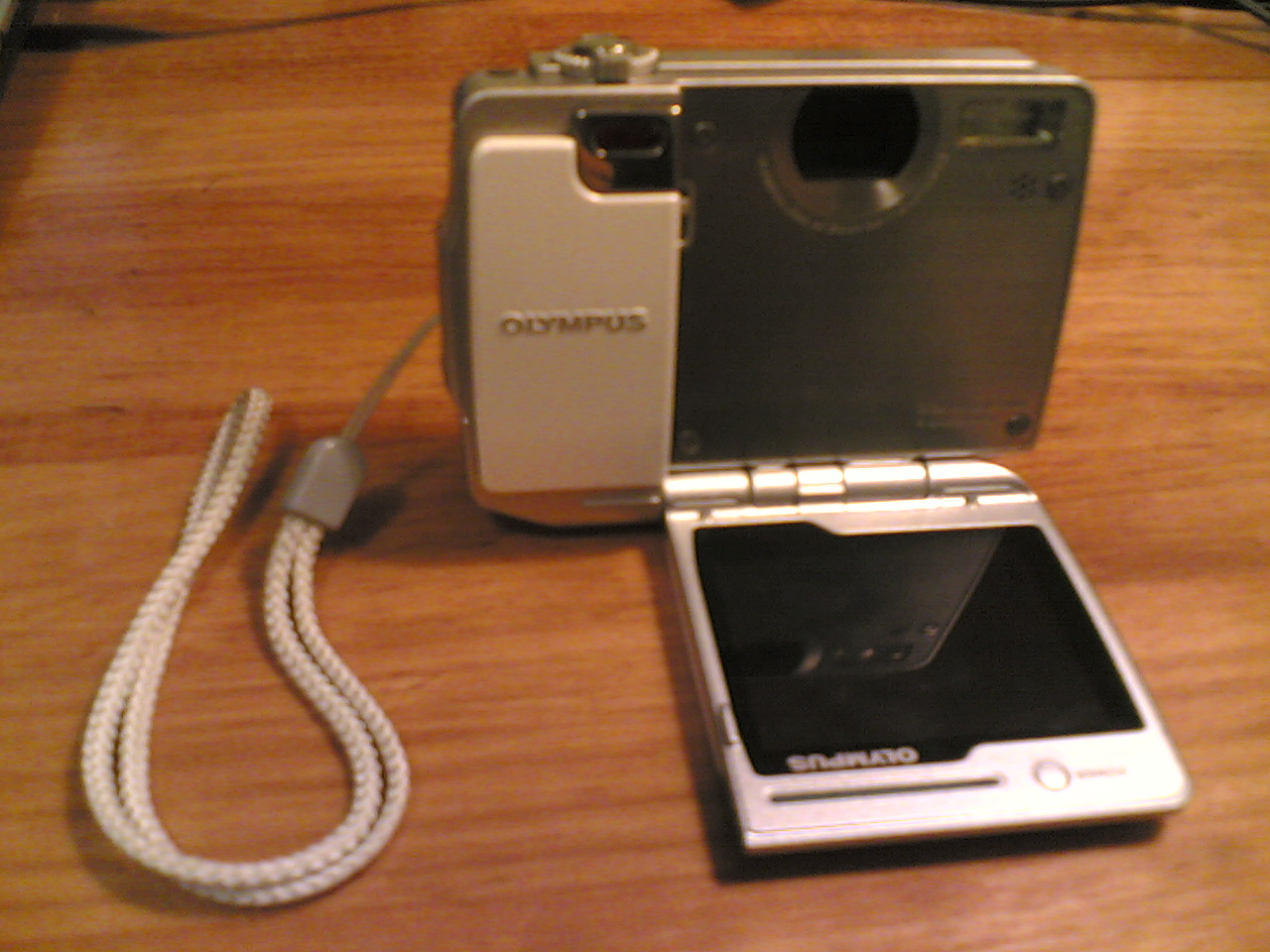
Olympus IR-500.

This camera was meant to be a part of a new digital system by Olympus thought to avoid the use of a personal computer. Named Olympus Easy Imaging System or i:robe, this camera was supplied with a cradle which allows the connection of a 40 GiB hard disk drive (S-HD-100; directly) and a photographic printer (P-S100; through USB). The cradle also allows the typical functions of recharging and connection to an external screen via RCA cable (with sound). The connection to a personal computer is made through a USB cable attached to the cradle.

== Additional Specifications ==
The lens is an Olympus aspherical glass zoom lens 6.2 – 17.3 mm. The 2.8× zoom is equivalent to 40-112mm in 35 mm photography. The camera has a built-in flash. Movies with sound can be recorded, the recording time is dependent on the xD card capacity. They are in QuickTime (.mov) format. Recording at 320x240 the resultant movie has 30 frame/s, at any other resolution the framerate drops to 15 frame/s. The camera uses an Olympus Li-12B battery.

== Sample photos ==
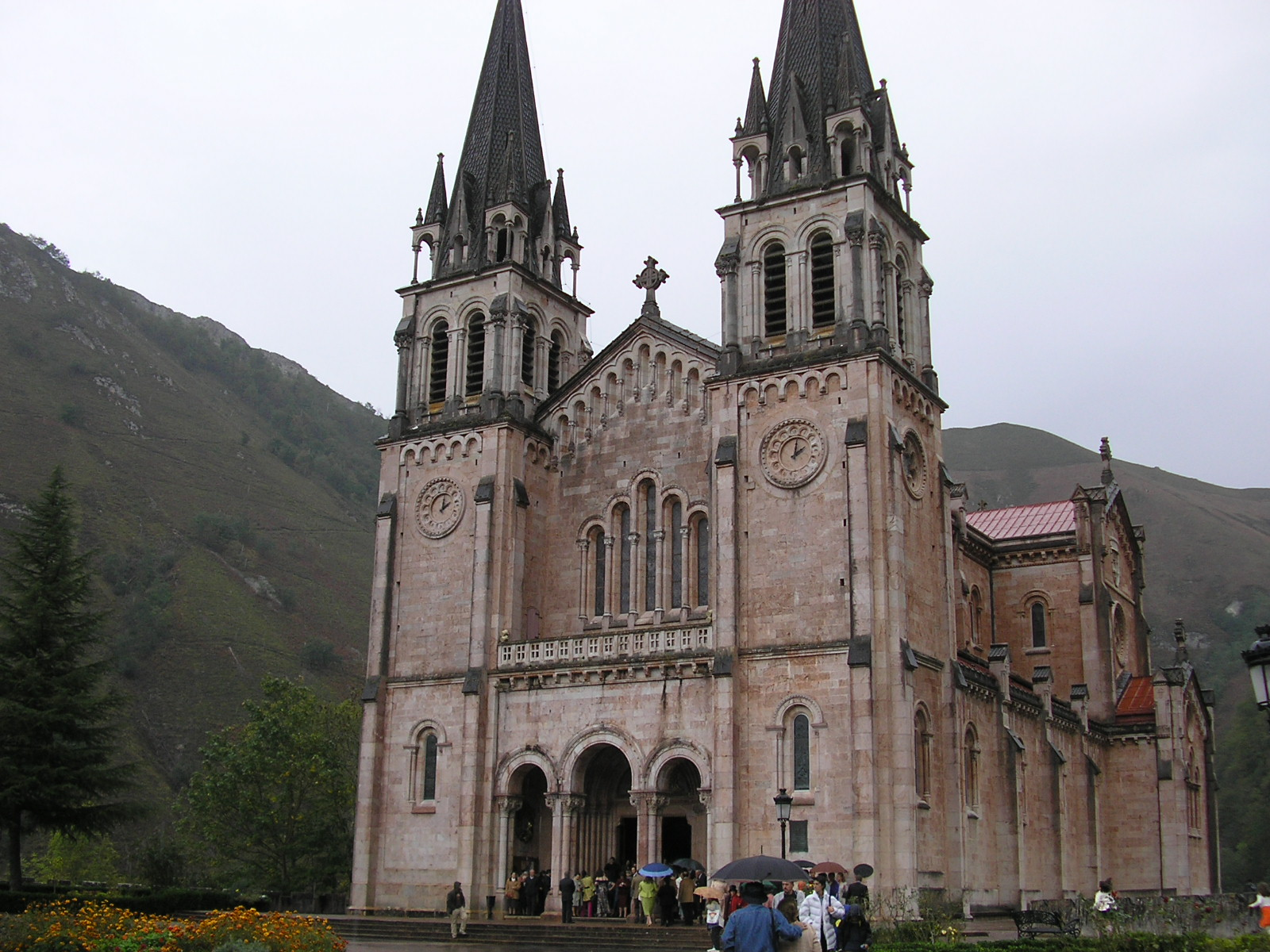

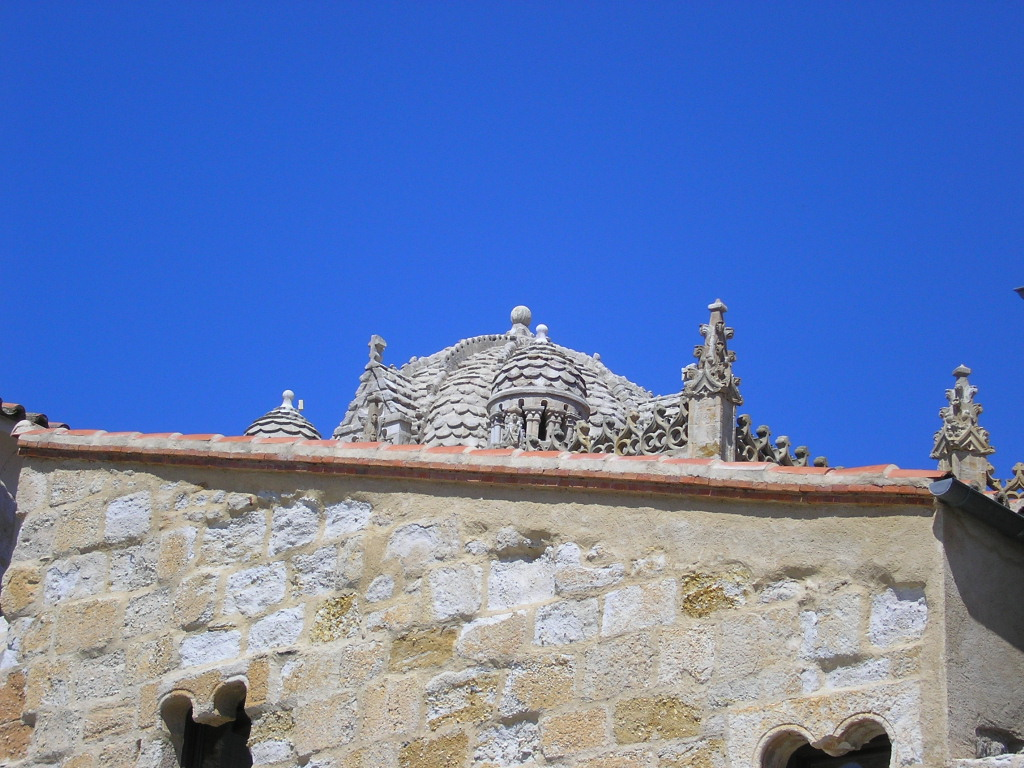

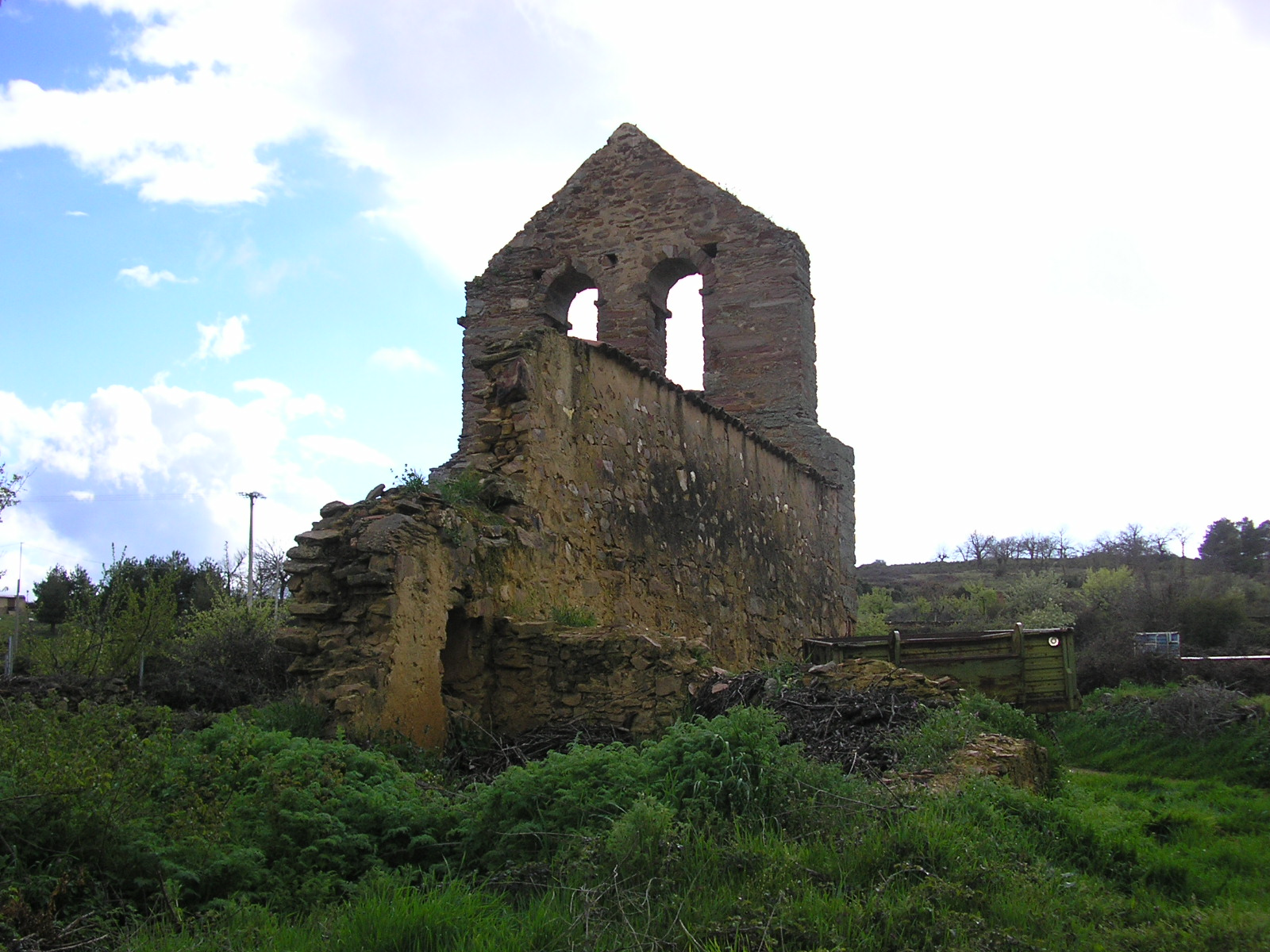
