= Olympus FE-310 =

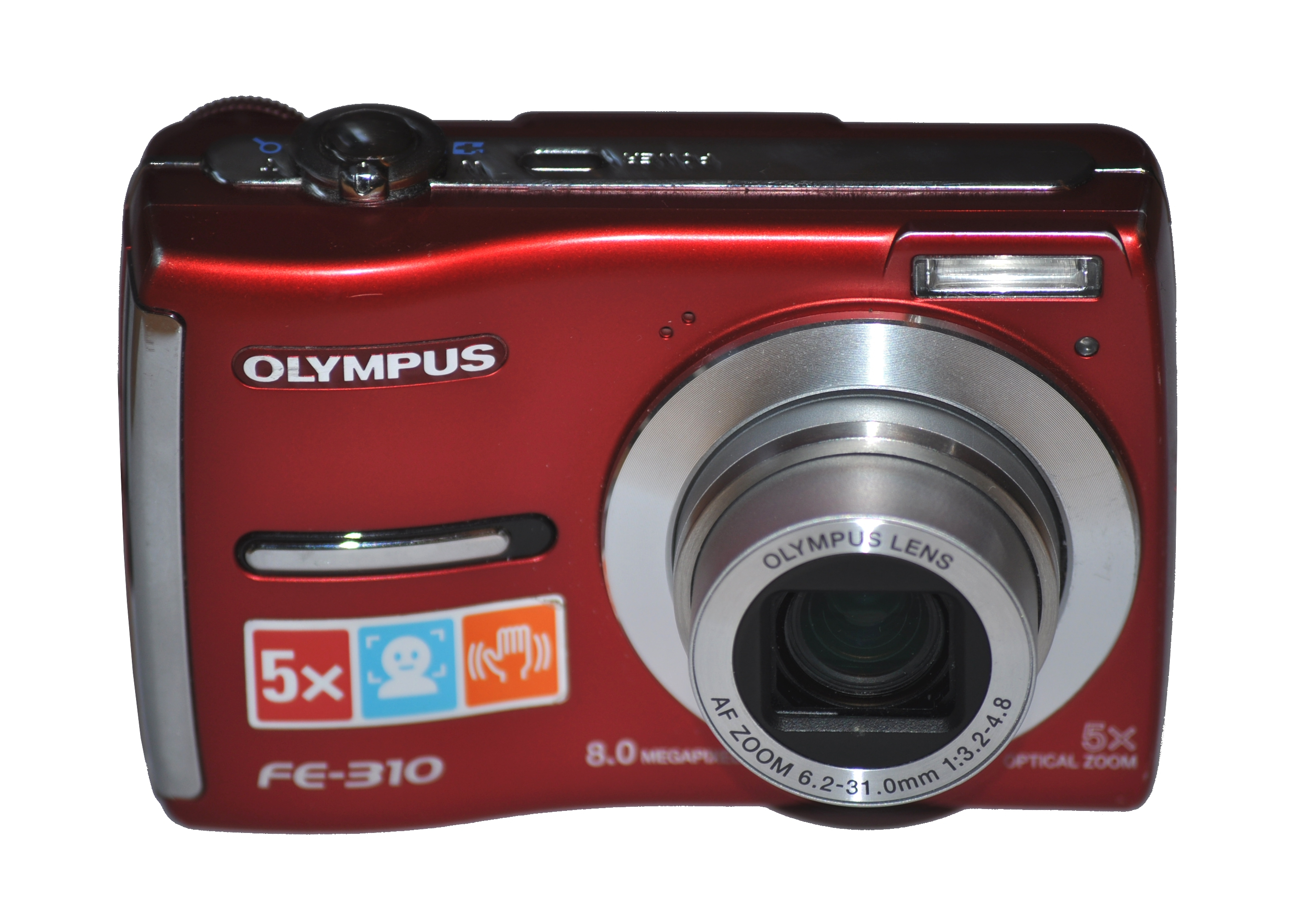

Overview
- Type: Digital camera

Lens
- Lens: 6.2 – 31 mm (37 – 185mm equivalent in 35 mm photography, 9 Lenses in 7 Groups, 3 Aspherical Lenses, 5x zoom ratio, F3.2 - F4.8

Sensor/medium
- Sensor: 1/2.5” CCD
- Maximum resolution: 8 megapixels
- Film speed: Auto, 80, 100, 200, 400, and 640
- Storage media: xD Picture Card and 20.5MB Internal Memory

Flash
- Flash: Built-in

Shutter
- Shutter speed range: 4 – 1/2,000 sec.

General
- LCD screen: 2.5" TFT LCD, 154,000 pixels, live preview capable
- Battery: Two AAs

Olympus FE-310 is a digital camera made by Olympus Corporation. It was released February 2008.

== Specifications ==
Compression

- "Fine" and "Normal" compression settings

Lens

- 6.2 – 31 mm (37 – 185 mm equivalent in 35 mm photography)
- 9 Lenses in 7 Groups
- 3 Aspherical Lenses

Zoom

- 5x optical zoom
- 4x digital zoom

Image sensor

- 8 Megapixels (effective)
- 1/2.5" CCD (1.0 cm)

Display

- 2,5" (6.4 cm) LCD
- Approx. 154,000 dots 2 steps Brightness Adjustment

Memory

- 20.5MB Internal Memory
- Expandable to 2GB with a xD-Picture Card

ISO Sensitivity

- Auto, 80, 100, 200, 400, 640 (equivalent)
