= Olympus Stylus 410 =

Stylus 410
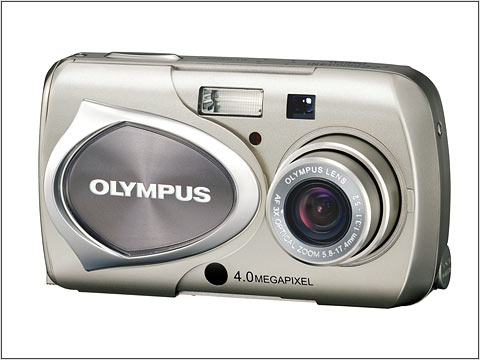
- An Olympus Stylus 410 camera.

Overview
- Maker: Olympus
- Type: 4.0 megapixel compact digital camera
- Released: May 2004

Lens
- Lens mount: Lens mount
- Lens: Aspherical glass 3x zoom lens 5.8 – 17.4 mm (35 – 105 mm equivalent in 35 mm photography), 5 lenses in 3 groups

Focusing
- Focus: TTL autofocus system

Exposure/metering
- Exposure: Auto/Program modes: f3.1 – f5.2, 1/1000 sec. – 1/2 sec. (Night scene: 1/1000 sec. – 4 sec.)

Flash
- Flash: Built-in

Shutter
- Frame rate: Rapid-fire speed

General
- Dimensions: 3.9" W x 2.2" H x 1.3" D (99.0 mm x 56.0 mm x 33.5 mm) excluding protrusions
- Weight: Weight 5.6 oz (160 g) without battery and media card

The Olympus Stylus 410, also known as μ("mju") 410D in some markets, is a 4.0 megapixel compact digital camera.
