= Olympus IS-100 =

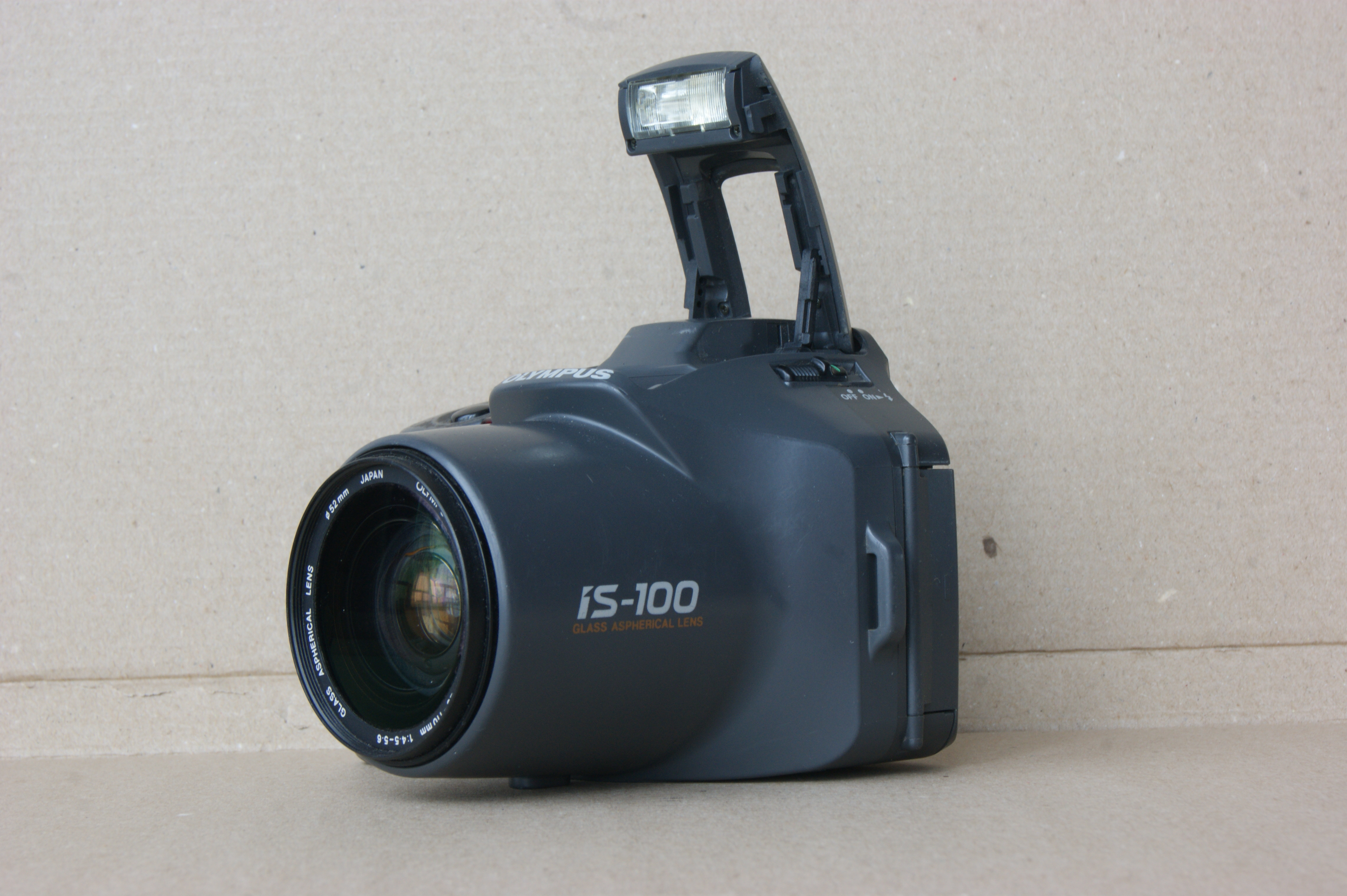

The Olympus iS-100 (a.k.a. L-10) is an autofocus 35mm single lens reflex camera with built-in 4.2× zoom lens. The lens is a multi-coated 28-120mm f4.5/5.6 lens with 11 elements in 9 groups. The autofocus is a passive CCD line sensor. The camera has a built-in flash, and of course a variety of flash and other shooting programs. Exposure is controlled electronically by a sensor behind a half-transparent mirror of the viewfinder system - multi-area metering mode and spot metering are selectable. The camera's shutter is a metal lamellae focal plane shutter with speeds up to 1/2000 sec. With its size 123x88x110mm (closed) and its weight of 615g it is a very compact and light construction of the Olympus iS series. The camera needs two CR123 batteries.

Modes
Full Auto	
Aperture priority	
Landscape	landscape shooting
Portrait	portrait shooting
Stop Action	shooting a moving subject
Night Scene	night shooting

Technical specifications
Aperture	f/4.5 - 5.6
Shutter speed range	1/2000 - 4 sec.
Power supply	2 x CR123A battery
Focal length	28 - 110 mm
Minimum shooting distance	75 cm
Flash	High power dual element
Automatic film recognition	25 - 3200 ISO
Dimensions	123 х 88 х 115 mm
Weight	615 g

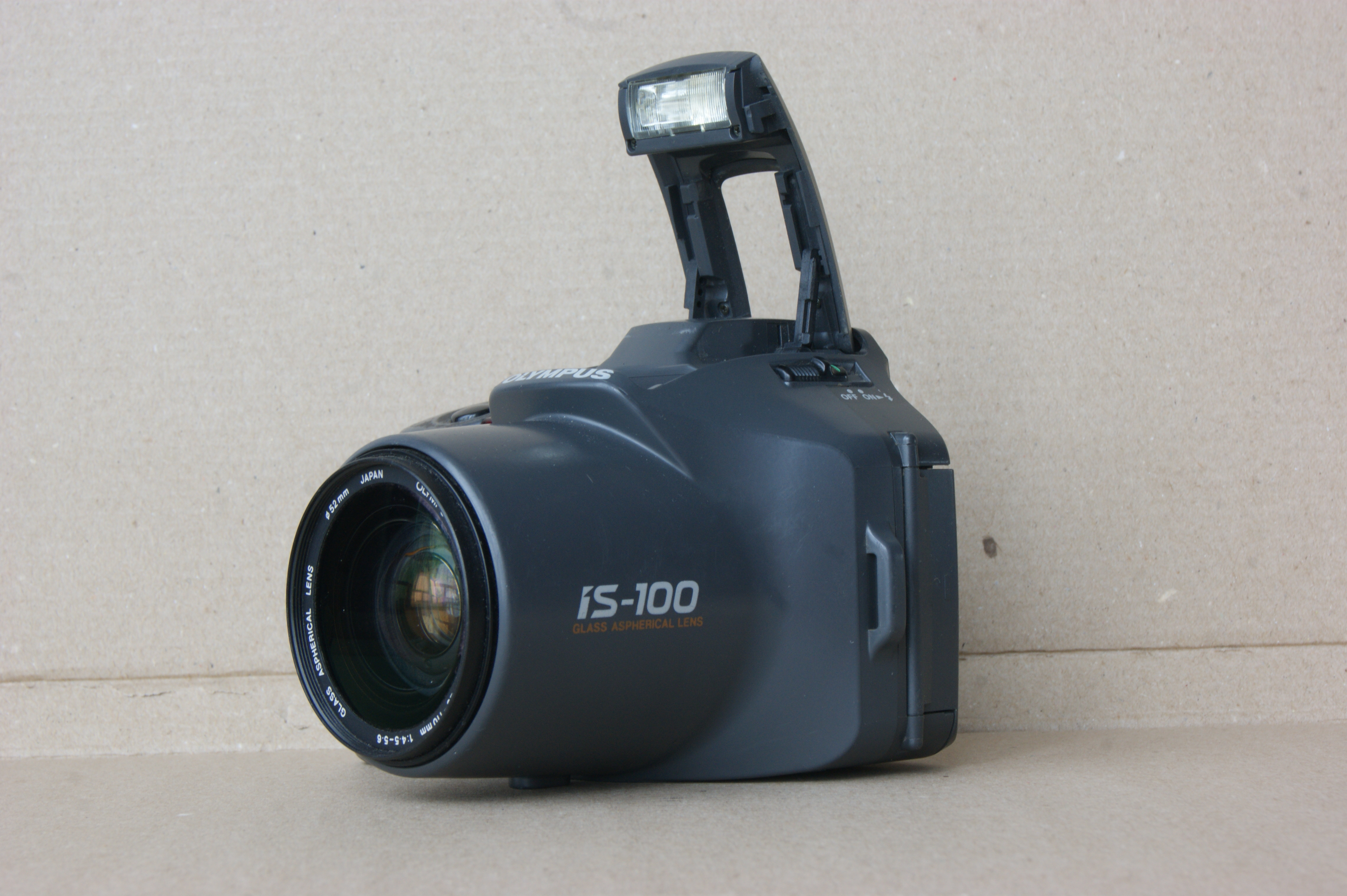

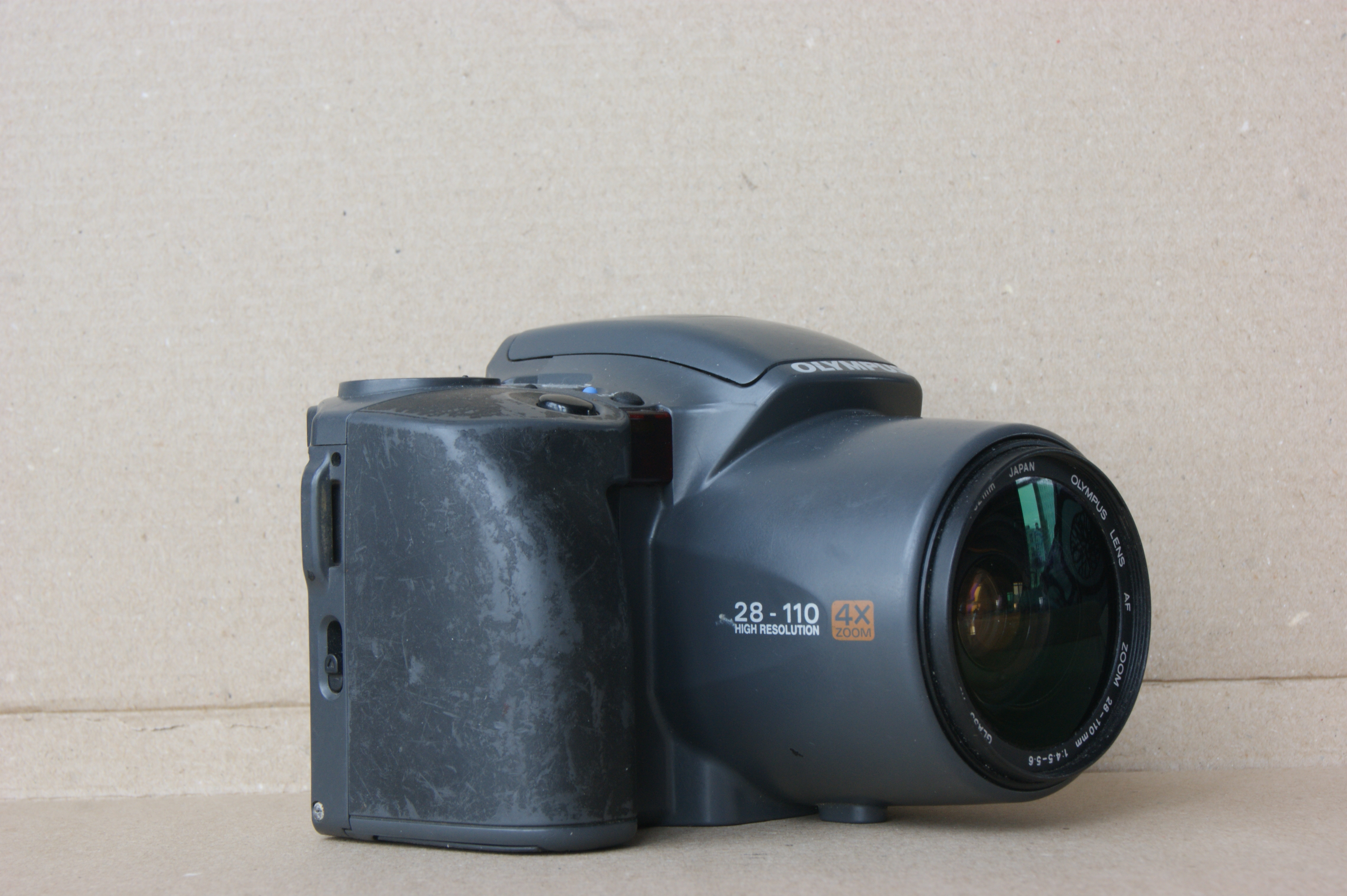

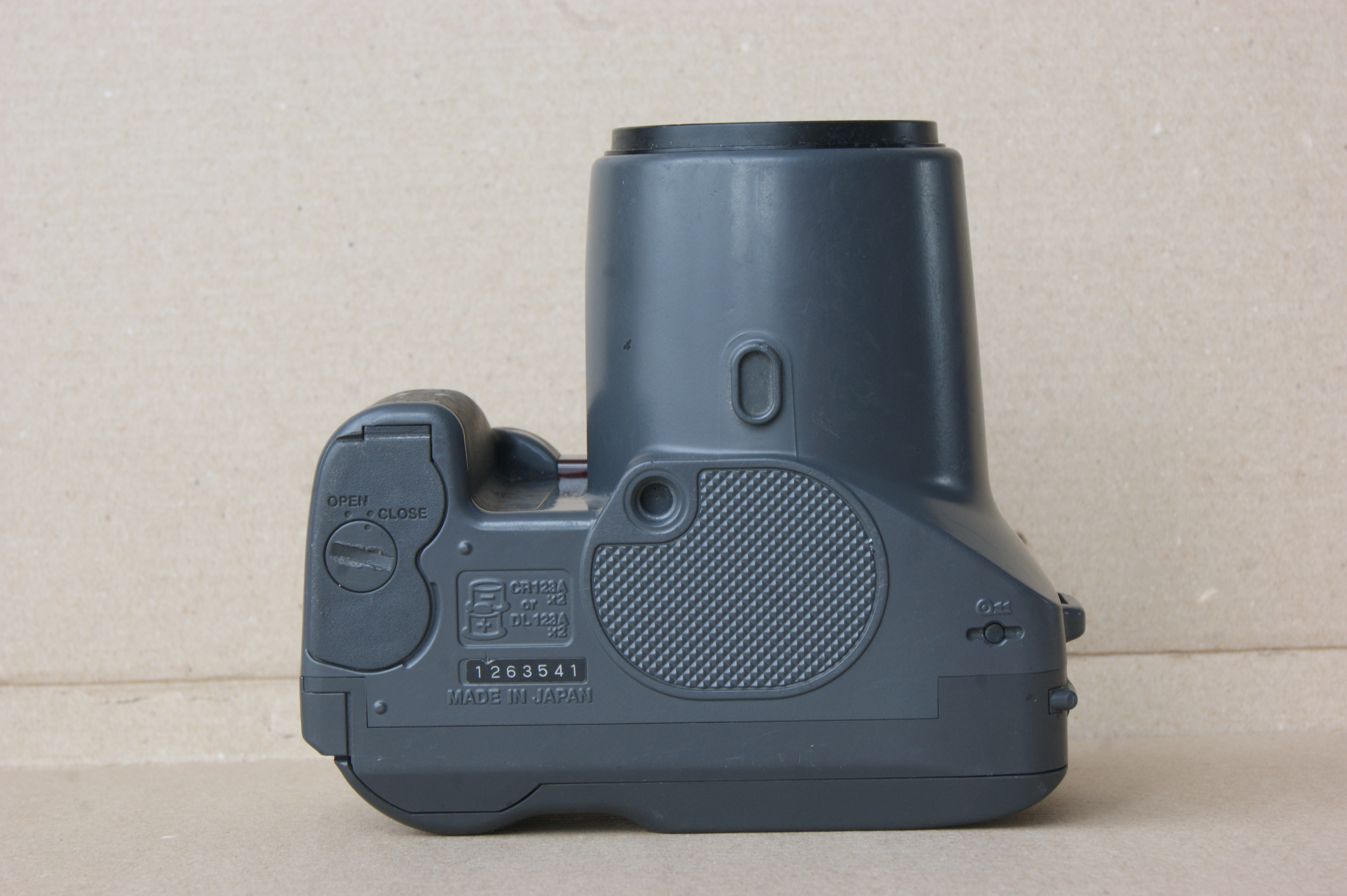

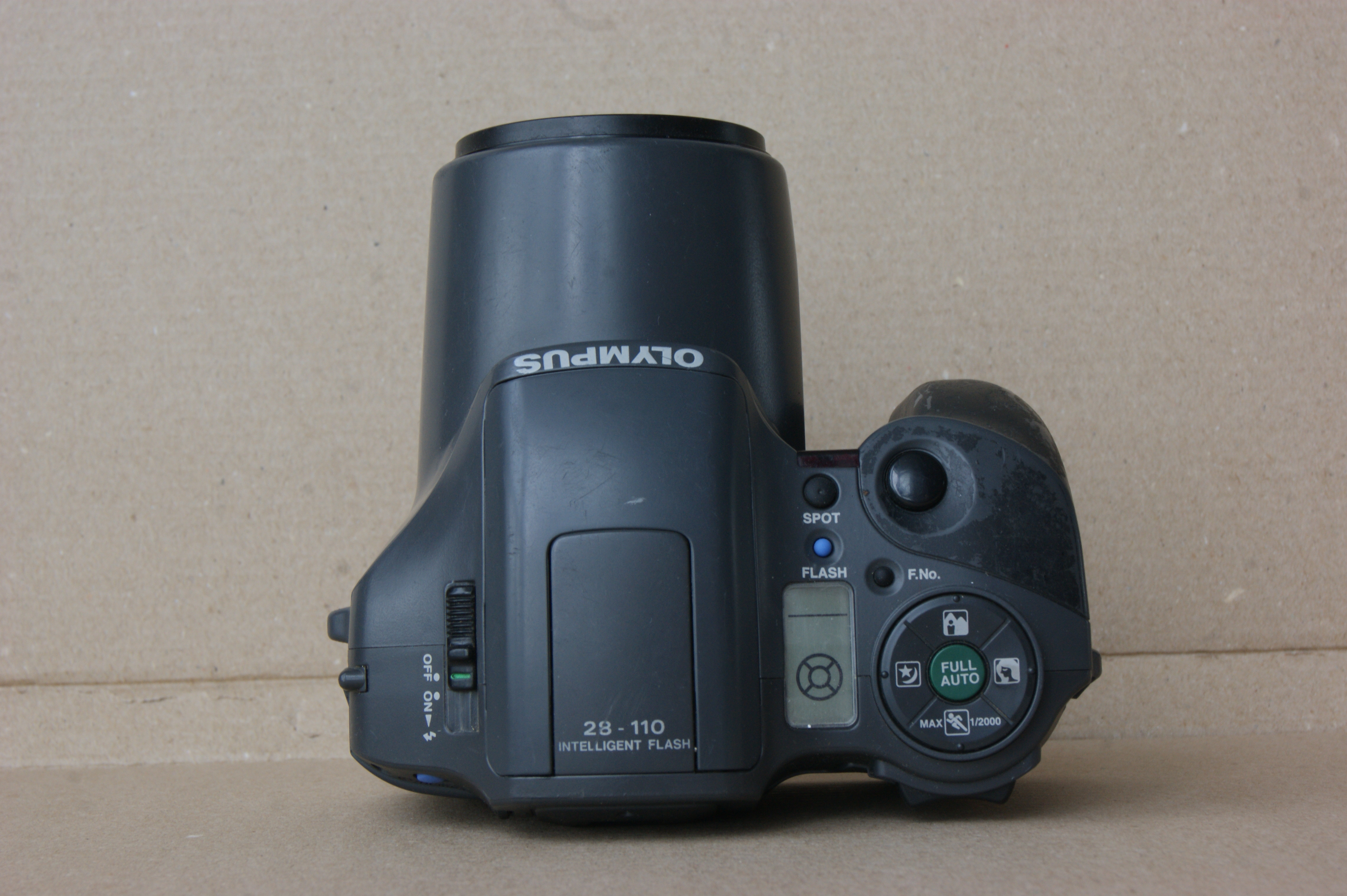

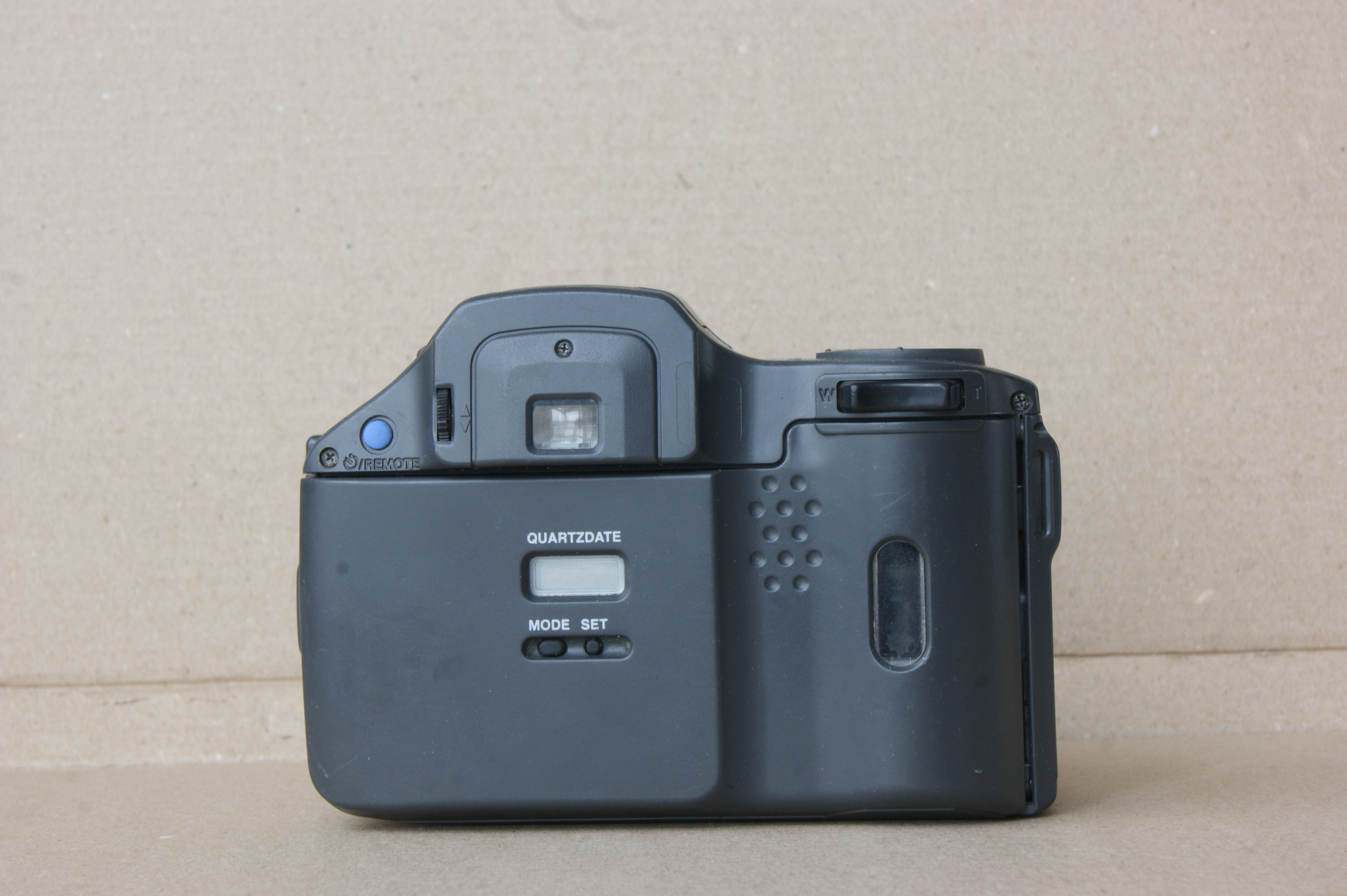

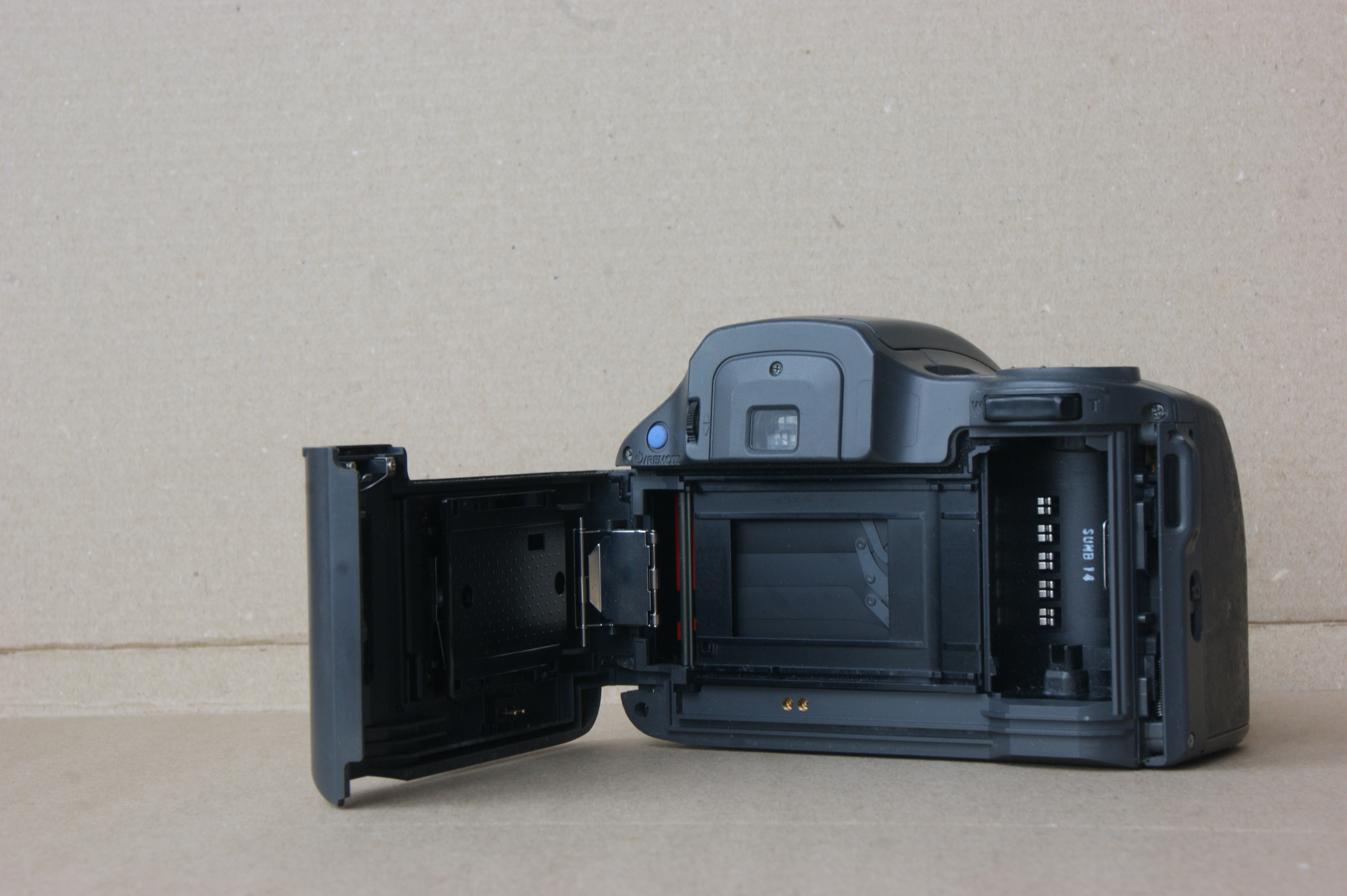
