= Olympus Stylus 725 SW =

Digital camera

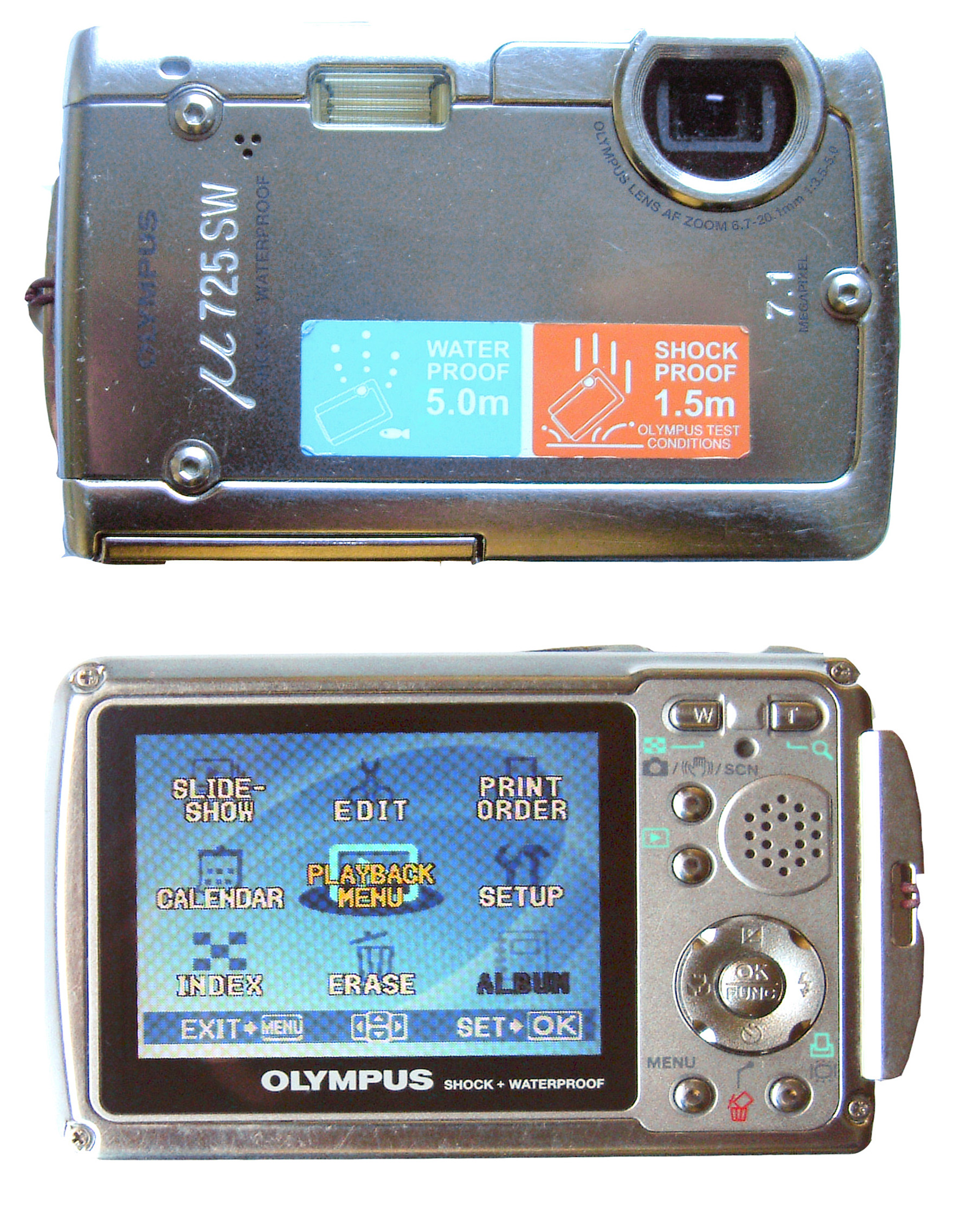

The Olympus Stylus 725SW, also known as mju μ 725 SW in some markets, is a 7.1 megapixel ultra-compact salt-water submersible digital camera introduced by Olympus Corporation in 2006.

== Features ==
- A 1/2.3 in-CCD
  - 7,380,000 gross / 7,110,000 effective pixels
- 6.7–20.1 mm + 3× optical zoom lens (3 5mm camera equiv. to 38–114 mm) f/3.5 to f/5.0
- Stainless steel and chrome body (SW) shockproof (1.7 m drop) and waterproof (up to 3 m/10 ft)
- Maximum resolution of 3,072 × 2,304 pixels.
- Dimensions: 91 × 58.7 × 19.8 mm
- Weight: 153 g, 15 g battery, and 1 g xD-Picture card
- M or H xD-Picture Card.

The μ 720 SW is available in several different colors: chrome-silver, light-red and blue.
