= Olympus FE Series =

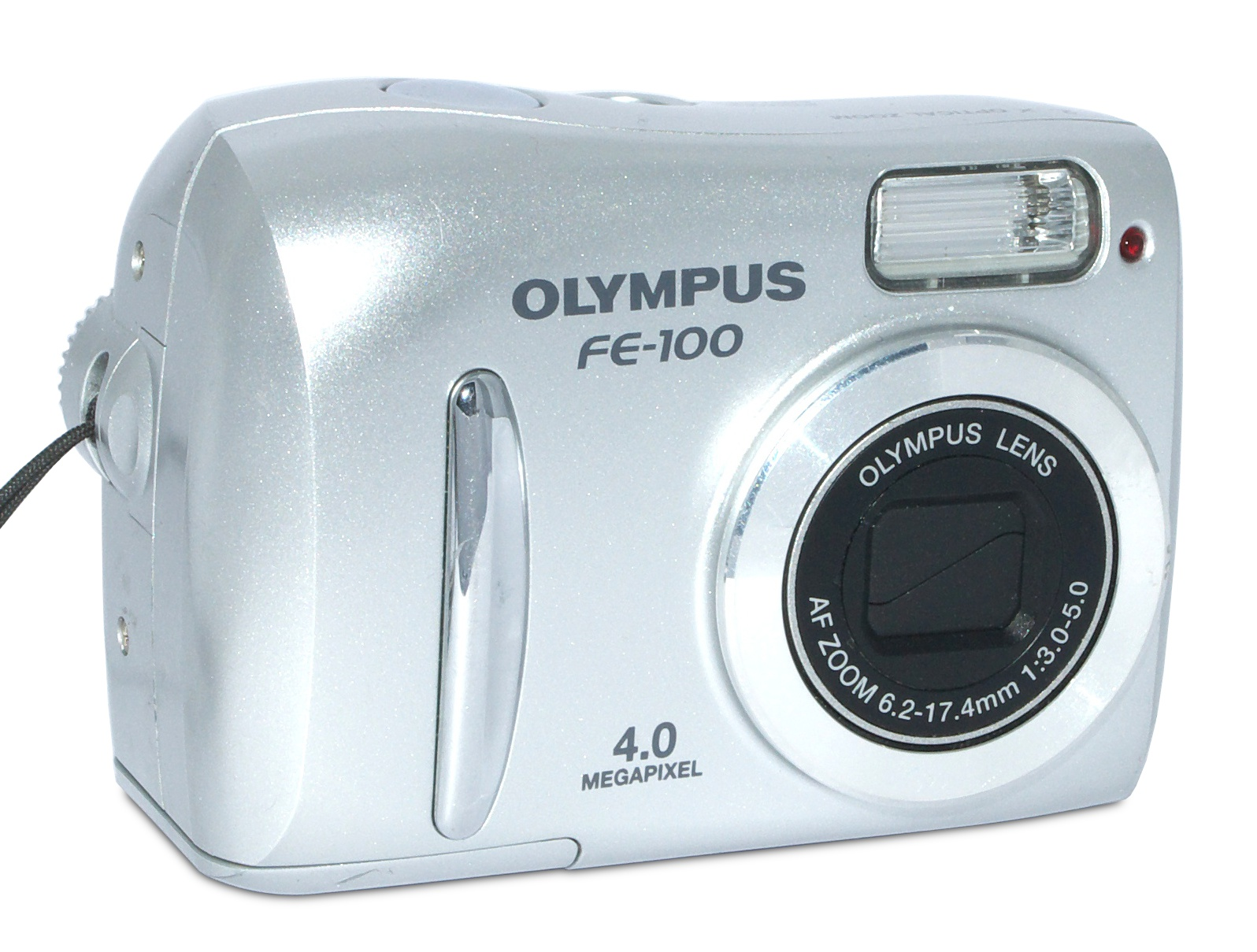
Olympus FE-100: the first camera in the series

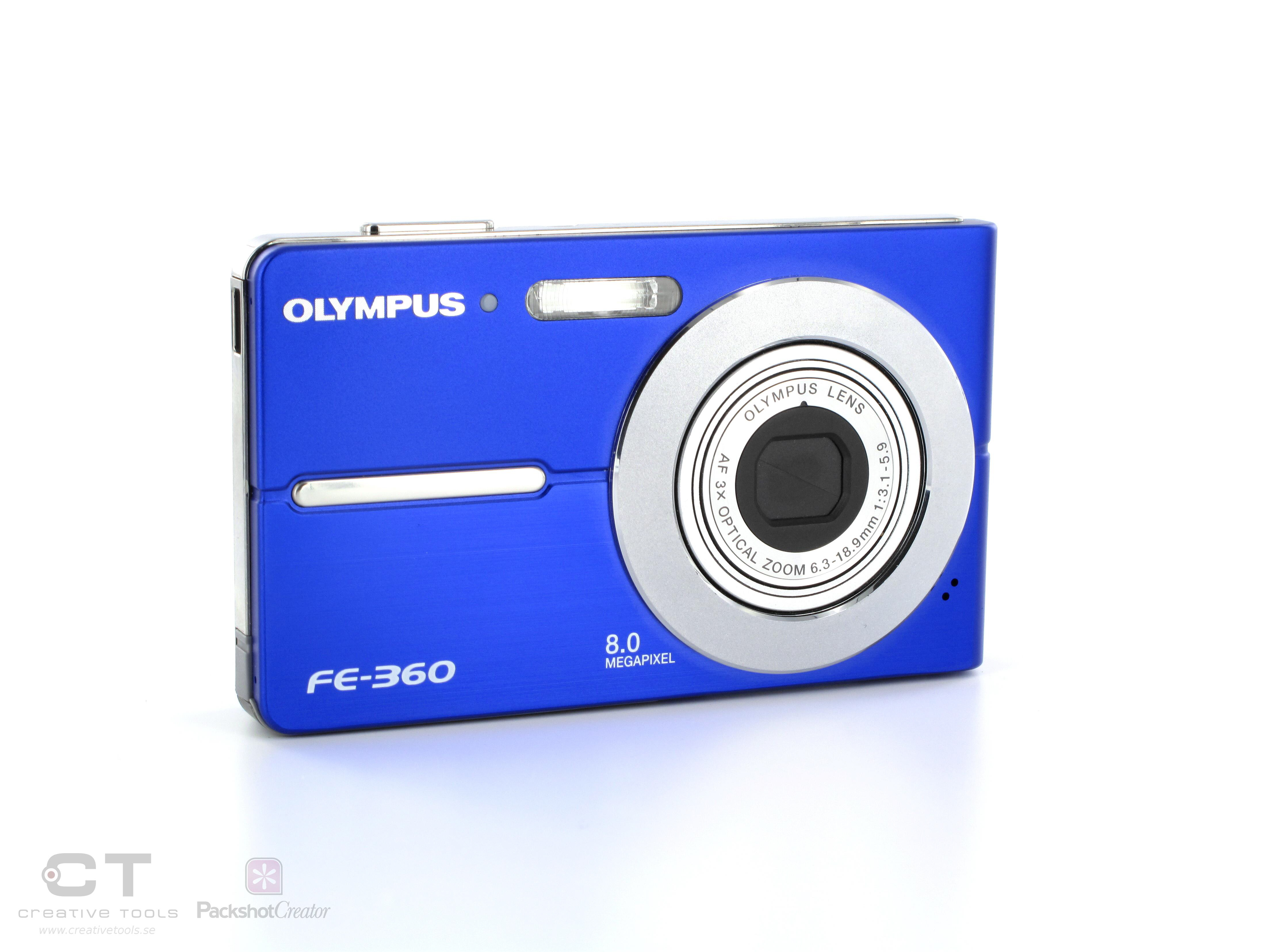
Olympus FE-360 (2008)

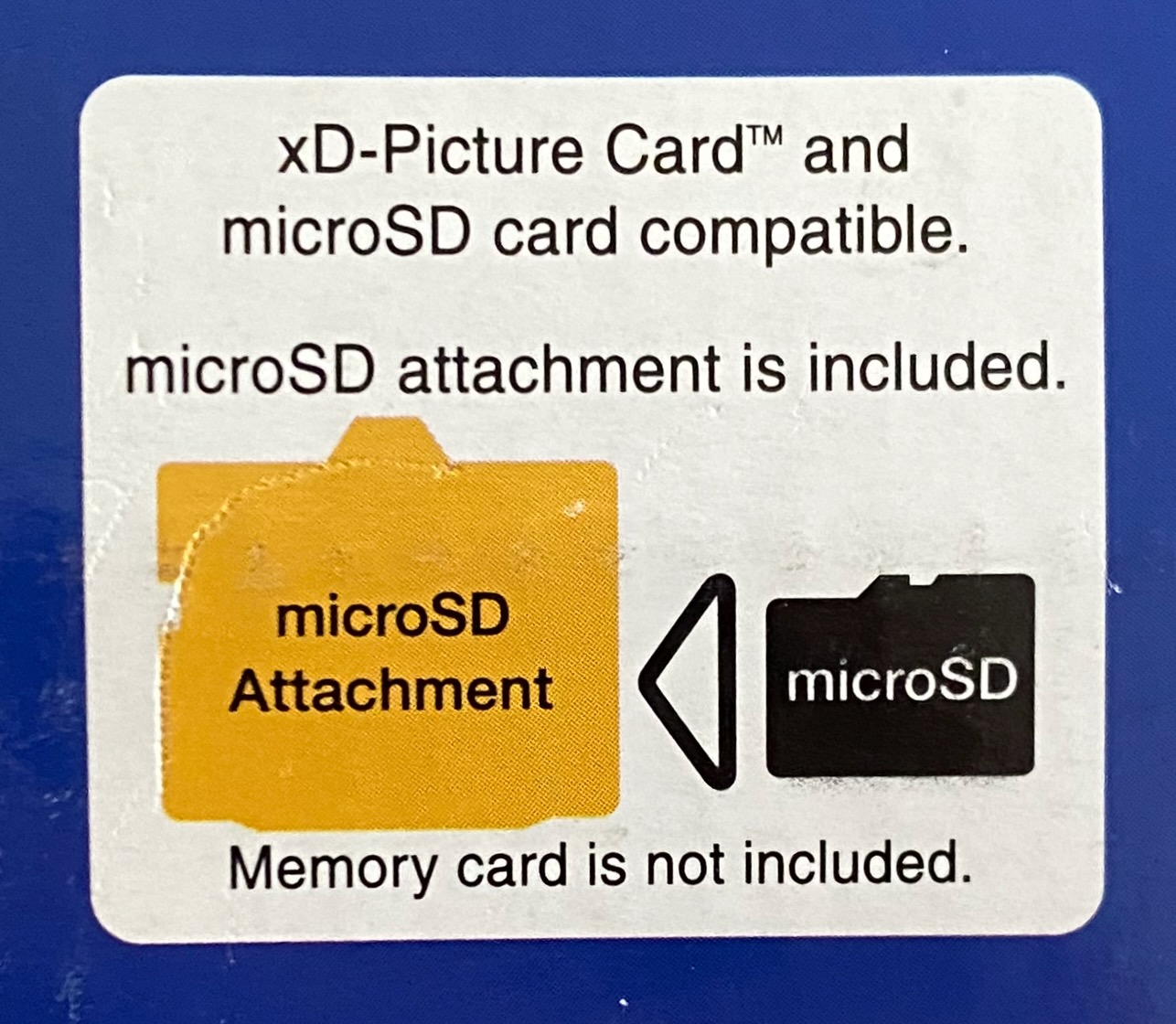
Some later FE series models were compatible with the Olympus MASD-1 XD-to-microSD adapter

The FE Series was a series of digital cameras from Olympus, which began with the introduction of the FE-100 in September 2005. The final camera in the series, the FE-5010, was launched in January 2009.

== Overview ==
The FE Series of cameras by Olympus
Model Name	Maximum resolution (megapixels)	Comment/description	Release Date
Olympus FE-100	3.9	Also known as X-710, 2.8× optical zoom, 4× digital zoom	September 2005
Olympus FE-110	5.0	Also known as X-705, 2.8× optical zoom, 4× digital zoom	September 2005
Olympus FE-115	5.0	Also known as X-715, 2.8× optical zoom, 4× digital zoom	February 2006
Olympus FE-120	6.0	Also known as X-700, 3× optical zoom, 4× digital zoom	September 2005
Olympus FE-130	5.1	Also known as X-720, 3× optical zoom, 4× digital zoom	February 2006
Olympus FE-140	6.0	Also known as X-725, 3× optical zoom, 4× digital zoom	February 2006
Olympus FE-150	5.0	Also known as X-730, 3× optical zoom, 4× digital zoom	April 2006
Olympus FE-160	6.0	Also known as X-735, 3× optical zoom, 4× digital zoom	March 2006
Olympus FE-170	6.0	Also known as X-760, 3× optical zoom, 4× digital zoom	September 2006
Olympus FE-180	6.0	Also known as X-745, 3× optical zoom, 4× digital zoom	September 2006
Olympus FE-190	6.0	Also known as X-750, 3× optical zoom, 4× digital zoom	September 2006
Olympus FE-20	8.0	Also known as X-15, 3× optical zoom, 4× digital zoom	September 2008
Olympus FE-25	10	3× optical zoom, 4× digital zoom	February 2009
Olympus FE-200	6.0	5× optical zoom, 4× digital zoom	September 2006
Olympus FE-210	7.1	3× optical zoom, 4× digital zoom	February 2007
Olympus FE-220	7.1	3× optical zoom, 4× digital zoom	February 2007
Olympus FE-230	7.1	3× optical zoom, 4× digital zoom	February 2007
Olympus FE-240	7.1	5× optical zoom, 4× digital zoom	February 2007
Olympus FE-250	8.0	3× optical zoom, 4× digital zoom	February 2007
Olympus FE-270	7.1	3× optical zoom, 4× digital zoom	September 2007
Olympus FE-280	8.0	Also known as X-820 and C-520. 3× optical zoom, 4× digital zoom	September 2007
Olympus FE-290	7.1	4× optical zoom, 4× digital zoom	September 2007
Olympus FE-300	12.0	3× optical zoom, 4× digital zoom	September 2007
Olympus FE-3000	10.0	3× optical zoom, 4× digital zoom	January 2009
Olympus FE-3010	12.0	3× optical zoom, 4× digital zoom	March 2009
Olympus FE-310	8.0	5× optical zoom, 4× digital zoom	February 2008
Olympus FE-320	8.0	3× optical zoom, 4× digital zoom	February 2008
Olympus FE-340	8.0	5× optical zoom, 4× digital zoom	February 2008
Olympus FE-350	8.0	4× optical zoom, 4× digital zoom	February 2008
Olympus FE-360	8.0	3× optical zoom, 4× digital zoom	September 2008
Olympus FE-370	8.0	5× optical zoom, 4× digital zoom	September 2008
Olympus FE-4000	12.0	Also known as X-900, X-925, 4× optical zoom, 4× digital zoom	January 2009
Olympus FE-45	10.0	3× optical zoom, 4× digital zoom	January 2009
Olympus FE-5000	12.0	5× optical zoom, 4× digital zoom	January 2009
Olympus FE-5010	12.0	5× optical zoom, 4× digital zoom	January 2009
