= Olympus C-765 Ultra Zoom =

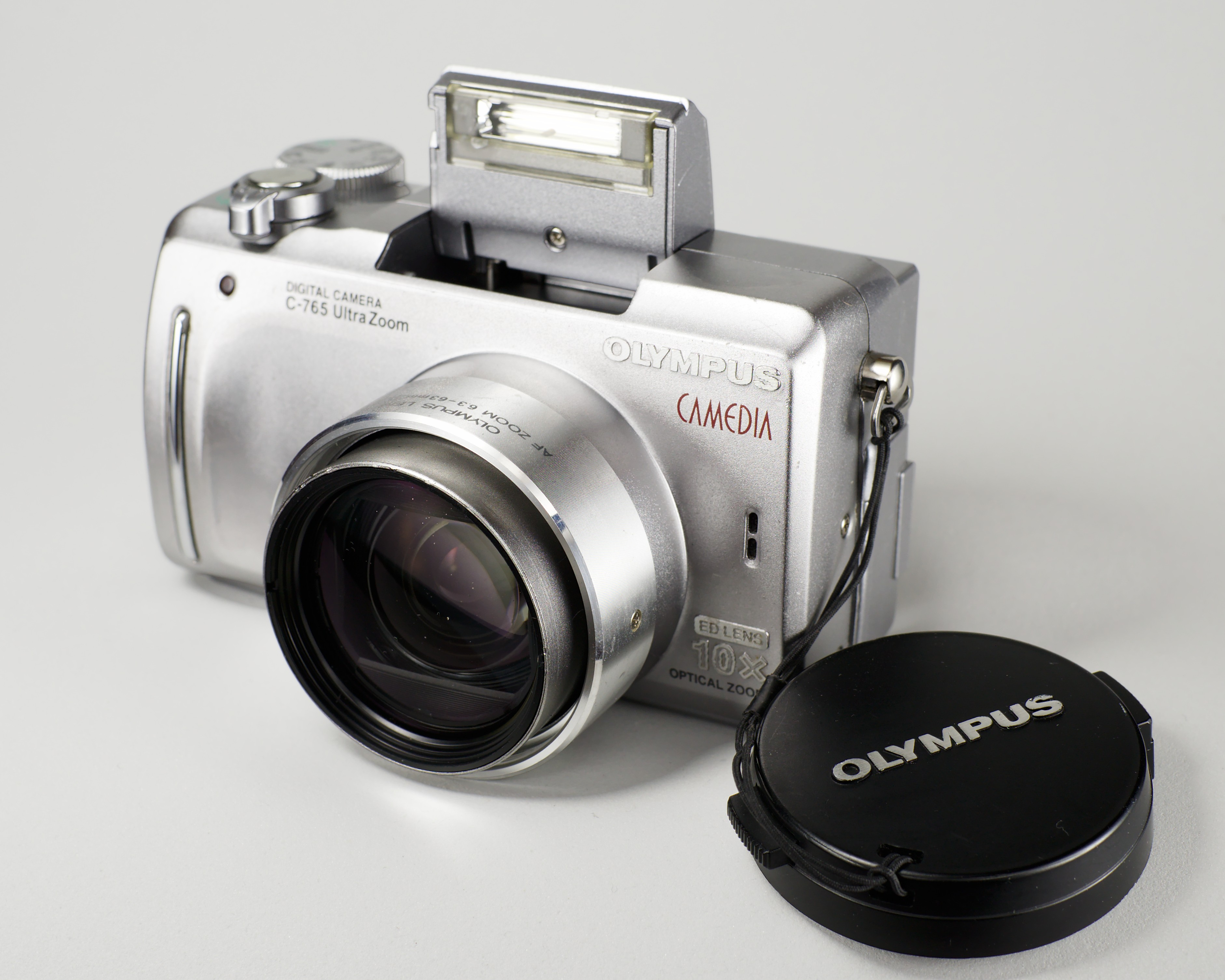

The Olympus Camedia 765 Ultra Zoom is a 4.0 megapixel camera with a 10x optical zoom manufactured by Olympus starting in 2004. It is powered by a lithium-ion battery.
