= Olympus C-2100 UZ =

The Olympus C-2100 UZ is a digital camera, closely paired with its brother the E-100 RS.

Both of these cameras are noteworthy because they are the only compact digital cameras ever produced by a company other than Canon, using a Canon lens. Both cameras have a 10x zoom, ranging from 38 to 380 mm equivalent. In fact, these were the first compact digital cameras to offer image stabilization by several years. It was also the first camera of its kind to offer f2.8 throughout the focal range.
