= Timeline of Olympus creative digital cameras =

== Graphical timeline ==
This timeline concentrates on the "creative" digital camera models from Olympus, i.e. those where there is the possibility to control aperture, shutter speed and focus.

=== References ===
- , Olympus camera archive
- , Source page
