= Olympus FE-340 =

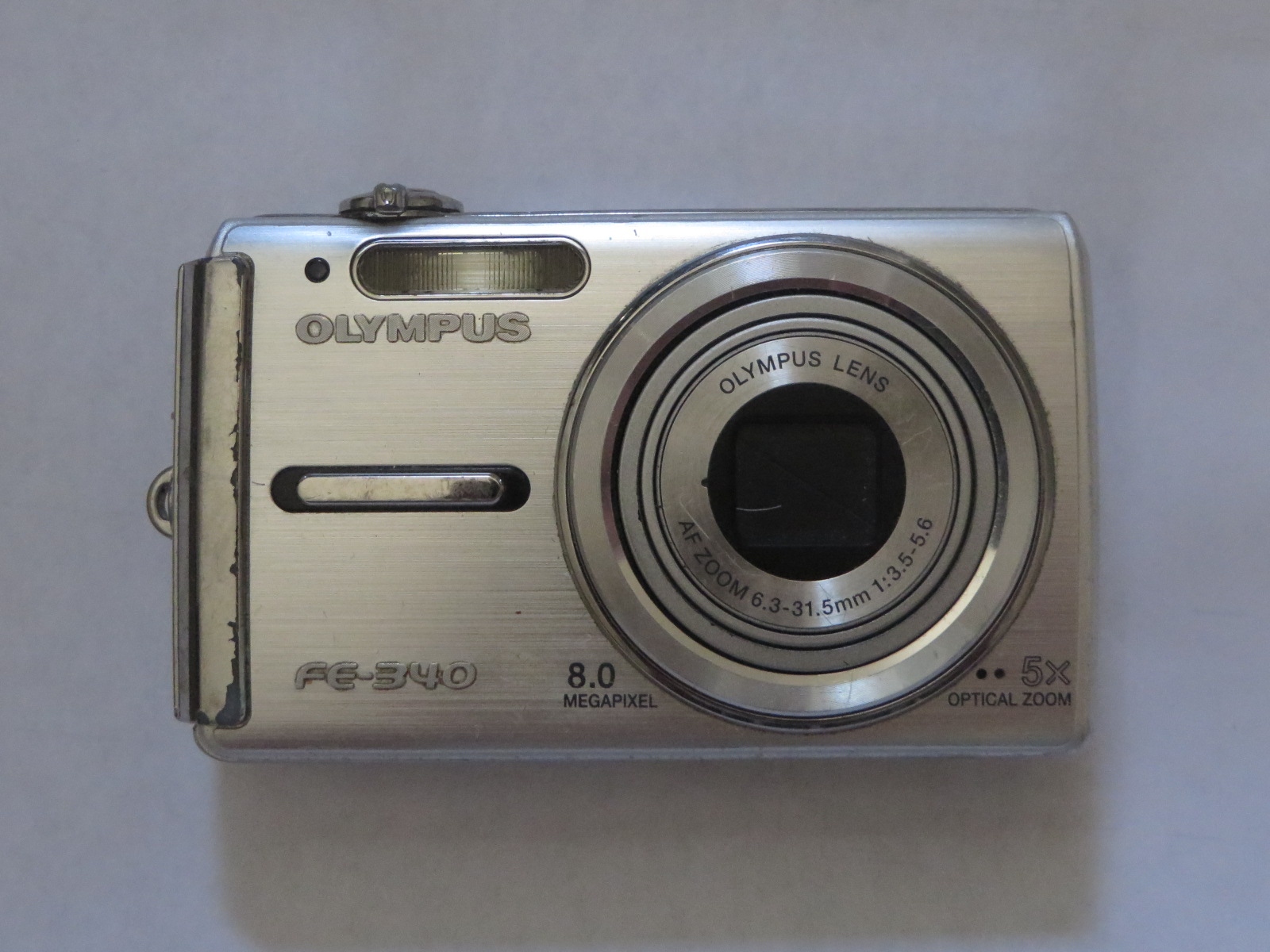

Overview
- Maker: Olympus Corporation
- Type: Digital camera

Lens
- Lens: 6.3 – 31.5mm (36 – 180mm equivalent in 35mm photography), 5× zoom ratio, F3.5 - F5.6

Sensor/medium
- Sensor: 1/2.35” CCD
- Maximum resolution: 8 megapixels
- Film speed: Auto, 64, 100, 200, 400, 800, 1600, and 3200
- Storage media: xD Picture Card and 48MB internal memory

Exposure/metering
- Exposure metering: Digital ESP metering

Flash
- Flash: Built-in

Shutter
- Shutter speed range: 4 – 1/2,000 sec.

General
- LCD screen: 2.7" TFT colour LCD, 230,000 pixels, live preview capable
- Dimensions: 96.9 mm × 57.5 mm × 22.6 mm (3.8 × 2.3 × 0.9 inches) battery = Lithium ion (LI-42B) 3.7 volt rechargeable
- Weight: 116 g (4.1 oz) without battery and memory card
- Made in: Vietnam

The Olympus FE-340 is a compact digital camera made by Olympus Corporation for still and video photography. It was released in February 2008.

== Specifications ==
Compression

- Fine and Normal compression settings

Lens

- 6.3 – 31.5mm (36 – 180mm equivalent in 35mm photography)

Zoom

- 5x optical zoom
- 4x digital zoom

Normal focus range

- 15.7" (40 cm) to infinity

Macro focus range

- 1.2" (3 cm) to infinity

Exposure adjustment range (EV)

- +/- 2.0EV in 0.3EV steps

Metering modes

- Digital ESP AE, face detection AE with face detection AF

Image sensor

- 8 Megapixels (effective)
- 1/2.35" CCD (1.08 cm)

Aspect ratio

- 4:3 and 16:9

Display

- 2.7" (6.9 cm) TFT colour LCD
- 230,000 dots; 2 steps Brightness Adjustment

Memory

- 48MB Internal Memory
- Expandable to 2GB with a xD-Picture Card

ISO sensitivity

- Auto, 64, 100, 200, 400, 800, 1600, and 3200 (equivalent)

Self timer

- 12 seconds

Flash modes

- Auto, Red-Eye Reduction, Fill-In, Off

Flash range description

- Wide: 0.33 - 12.8 feet (0.1 - 3.9m); Tele: 2.0 - 7.9 feet (0.6 - 2.4m) at ISO 800

Movie resolution

- 640 x 480 VGA and 320 x 240 QVGA

Movie frame rate

- 15 and 30 frames per second (fps)

Movie file format

- AVI Motion JPEG

== See also ==
- Gallery of images taken by the FE-340 in Wikicommons
