= Olympus C-7000 Zoom =

The Olympus C-7000 Zoom (known as the Olympus C-70 Zoom' in Europe and Southeast Asia) is a digital camera introduced in October 2004. The maximum resolution is 7.1 megapixels, and it features a 5× optical / 6× digital zoom.
