= Olympus C-220 Zoom =

C-220 Zoom
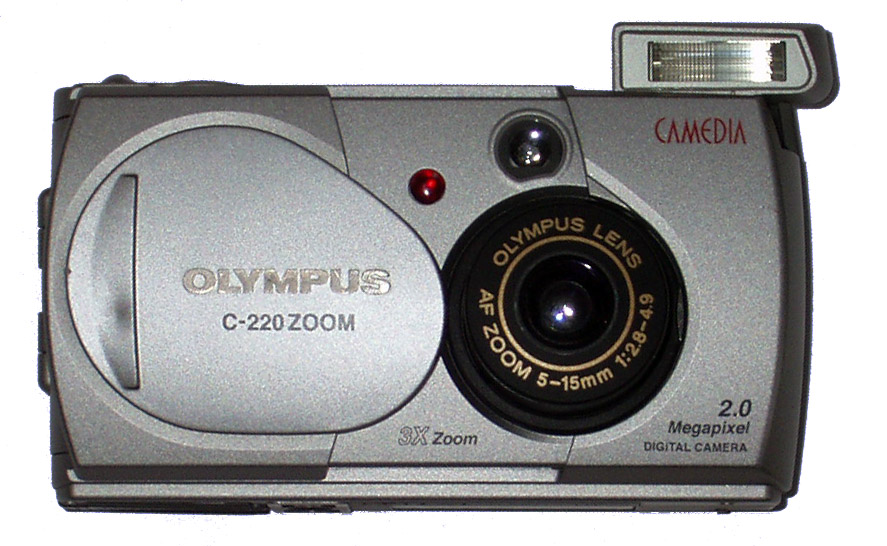

Overview
- Maker: Olympus Optical Co. Ltd.
- Type: Still image camera with motion capability

Lens
- Lens: Permanently attached 3x zoom lens
- F-numbers: 2.8-4.9

Sensor/medium
- Sensor type: Digital CCD
- Sensor size: 2 effective megapixel
- Recording medium: SmartMedia

Focusing
- Focus: Automatic

Shutter
- Shutter speeds: 1/2 to 1/2000 seconds

The Olympus C-220 Zoom, also known as Olympus D-520 Zoom, is an entry-level digital camera from Olympus. It works as a standard USB storage device, and uses SmartMedia cards for storage.
