= Olympus Superzoom 120TC =

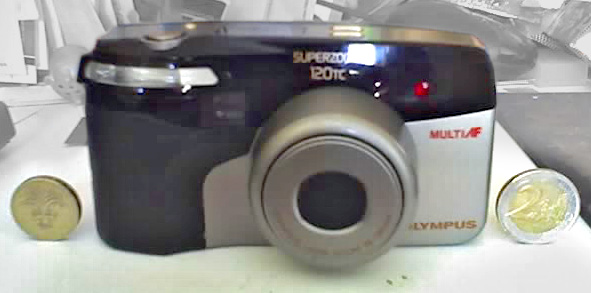
Olympus Superzoom with Pound and 2 Euro coins for size comparison

The Olympus Superzoom 120TC is a 35mm compact camera, most notable for being able to continuously shoot pictures at a rate of 4 frames per second. The 120 part of the model number represents the maximum telephoto focal length, the range being 35–120mm. The TC part indicates that it has a self-timer, and can be activated by an infra-red remote control. Another notable feature is that the zoom lens moves at 2 different speeds depending on how hard the button is depressed.
