= Olympus C-3000 Zoom =

C-3000 Zoom
Overview
- Maker: Olympus Optical Co. Ltd.
- Type: Still image camera with motion capability

Lens
- Lens: Permanently attached 3x Zoom Lens; external lenses with adapter tube
- F-numbers: 2.8, 3.2, 3.6, 4.0, 4.5, 5.0, 5.6, 6.3, 7.0, 8.0, 9.0, 10.0, 11.0

Sensor/medium
- Sensor type: Digital CCD
- Sensor size: 1/1.8-inch; 3.3 Megapixels
- Recording medium: SmartMedia, up to 128MB, removable

Focusing
- Focus: Automatic, Manual

Shutter
- Shutter speeds: 1/800 to 16 s

The Olympus C-3000 Zoom is a self-contained color digital camera system, produced by the Olympus Optical Co., Ltd.

== Features ==
The C-3000 Zoom offers a 3× optical zoom lens, support for SmartMedia storage, and a 3.3 megapixel, 1/1.8-inch CCD image sensor. The camera supports automatic "point-and-shoot" type photography (P Setting), as well as three manual modes (S - Shutter Priority, A - Aperture Priority, and M - Fully Manual). It supports lighting color correction (Flash, Sunlight, Clouds, Incandescent, Fluorescent, and Automatic). The camera supports an external flash via a proprietary connector and bracket, however it does not provide a hotshoe on the camera. The camera may be operated conventionally, fired via a remote control, fired by time delay, or fired-by-wire via software such as Cam2Com . The camera features F-Stop settings ranging from F2.8 to F11, and exposure settings from 1/800 to 16 seconds. The camera is powered by 4 AA alkaline batteries, 4 AA rechargeable batteries (NiMH) or 2 CR-V3 primary batteries.

One can take photos in a SHQ (Super High Quality) mode. It offers QuickTime Movie capture at 15 fps with sound. Sound can be recorded during video filming or a 4-second sound bite can be recorded for play with a single image. There are five small holes just above the lens on the right; this is the microphone.

== Limitations ==
The C-3000 Zoom, as with most consumer single-chip digital cameras, suffers from half-resolution imaging in the blue channel. Images taken of blue subjects will be unsuitable for use at the full 3.3 megapixels and will require downsampling. It does not support RAW image format. Also, the camera does not officially support the USB Storage class, which inherently means it must be driven using a camera control driver provided by Olympus or use the preexistent Microsoft Windows driver uncommenting a Line in the driver file.

== Package contents ==
From Owner's Manual (May vary from country to country)

- C-3000 Zoom Digital Camera
- Camera Strap
- Infrared Remote Control
- Mini-Stereo to A/V Cable
- Warranty Card
- LC-41 Lens Cap
- Instruction Manuals, Camera and Remote Control
- CR-V3 lithium battery packs (2)
- Software provided on CD
- USB Cable
- SmartMedia card (8MB, including labels, storage case, and write-protect seals)
- Instruction card
