= Olympus C-350 Zoom =

Olympus Camedia 350 Zoom
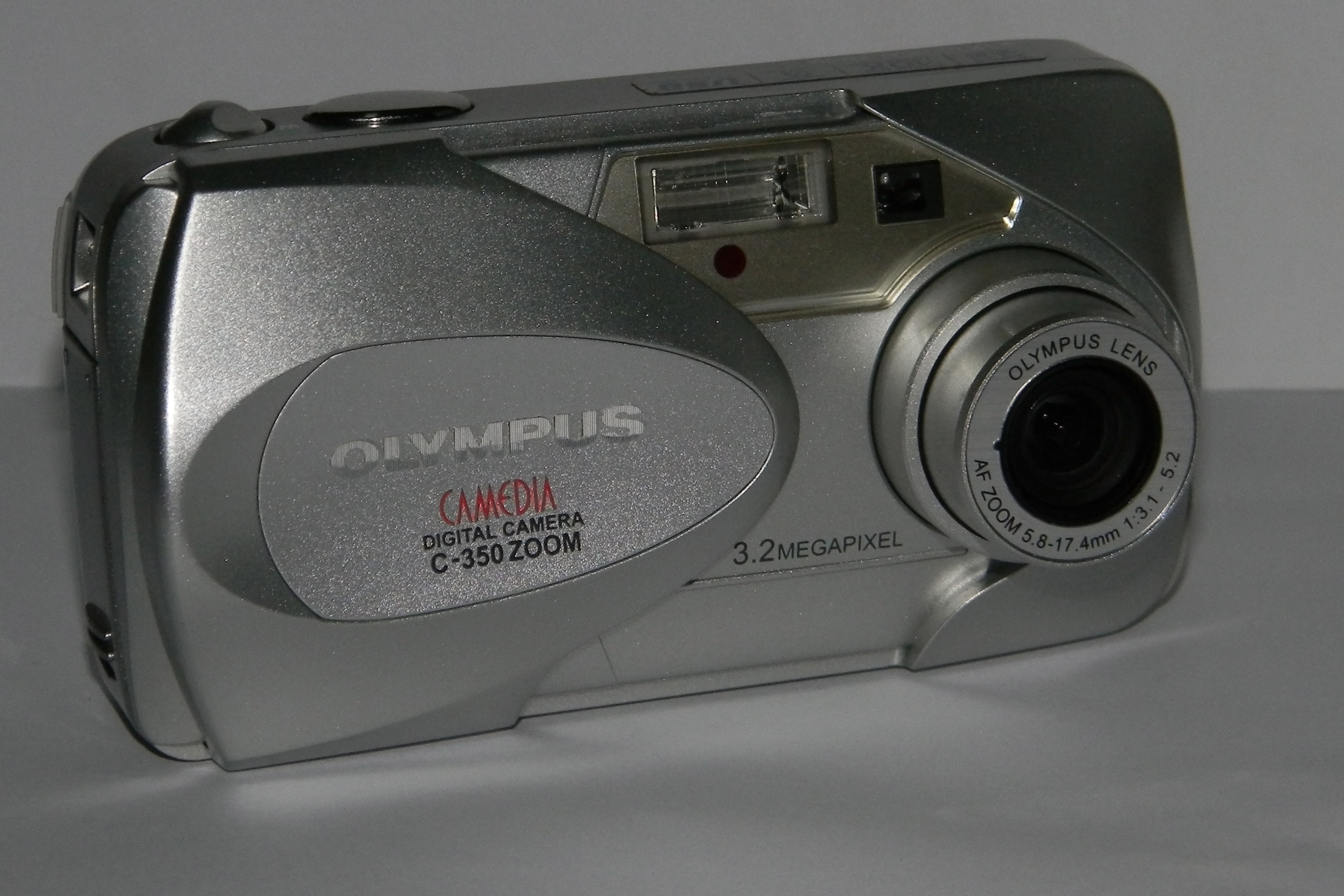

Overview
- Maker: Olympus Optical Co. Ltd.
- Type: Still image camera with motion capability

Lens
- Lens: Permanently attached 3x Zoom Lens
- F-numbers: Min: 3.1; Max: 5.2

Sensor/medium
- Sensor type: Digital CCD
- Sensor size: 3.2 megapixels
- Recording medium: xD Picture Card, removable

Focusing
- Focus: Automatic

Shutter
- Shutter speeds: 1/1000 to 2s

Olympus C-350 Zoom is a 3.2 megapixel compact (point and shoot) digital camera. The camera uses a 3.2 megapixel CCD sensor (2048x1536 pixels). It has 3x optical zoom lens but it can zoom up to 10x with digital zoom. As a storage media, it uses xD-Picture Card of capacity of 16 to 256 MB. As a power source it uses two AA batteries. The camera is also able to write video in resolution 160x120 and 320x240 at 15 fps in QuickTime MOV format. It was announced on March 2, 2003.
