= Olympus SP-500 Ultra Zoom =

The Olympus SP 500 Ultra Zoom is a 6.0-megapixel compact ultra-zoom digital camera introduced by Olympus Corporation in 2005.

It features a 2.5" LCD, a 10x zoom lens, and 5x digital zoom in a compact lightweight body. It is designed to satisfy the needs of both hobbyist photographers who desire full control over exposure settings and those that need only point and shoot simplicity.

== Lens ==
The lens is an Olympus aspherical glass zoom lens 6.3 – 63mm. The 10x zoom is equivalent to 38-380mm in 35mm photography.

== Flash ==
The camera has a built-in manual pop-up flash.

== Movies ==
Movies with sound can be recorded, the recording time is dependent on the xD card capacity. They are in QuickTime ( .mov) format.

== Power Source ==
The camera uses 4 AA batteries, which can be rechargeable. The camera also supports an AC adapter (Olympus adapter only).

== Sample photos ==
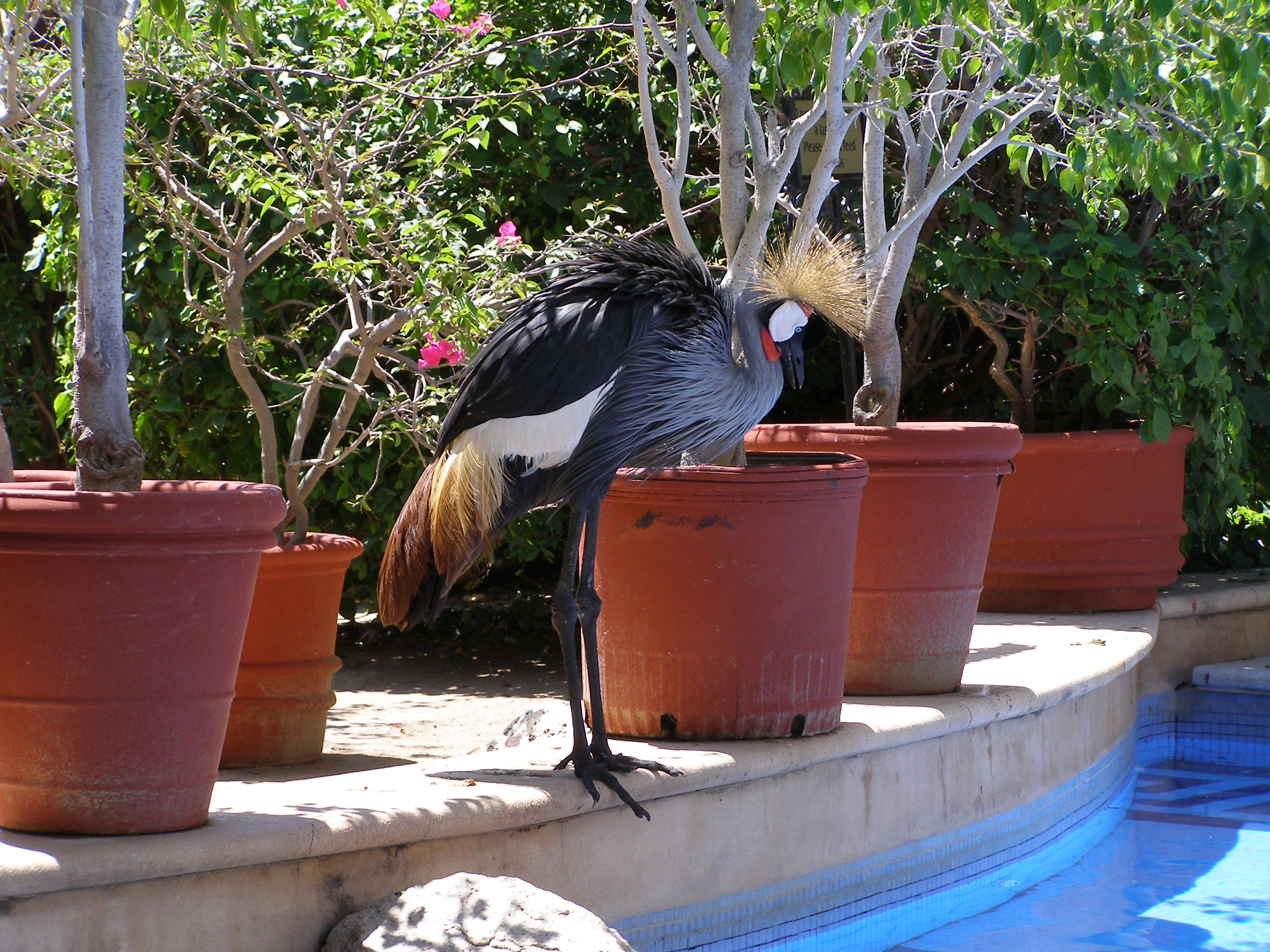

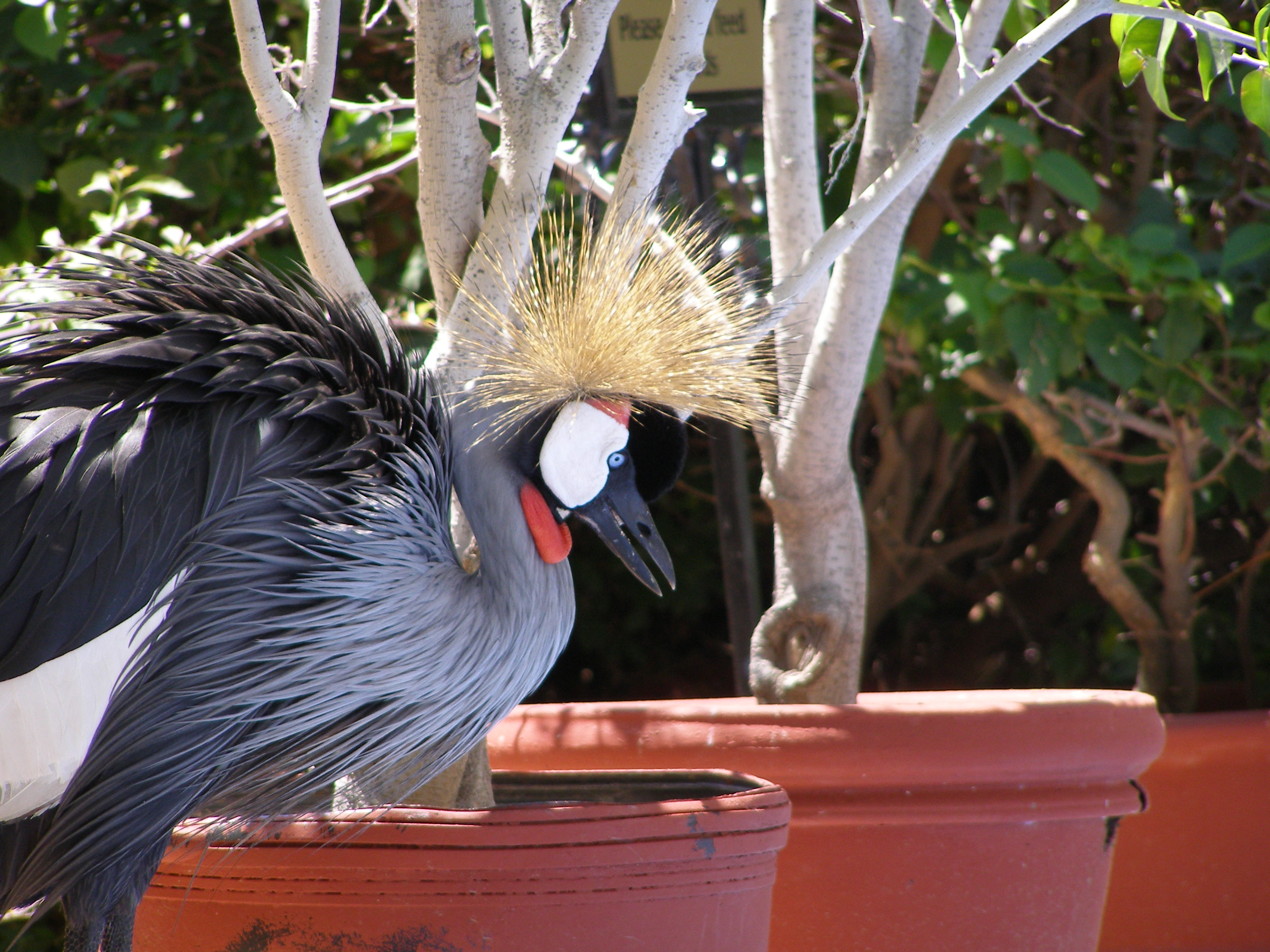
