= Leica Standard =

Leica Standard 1932
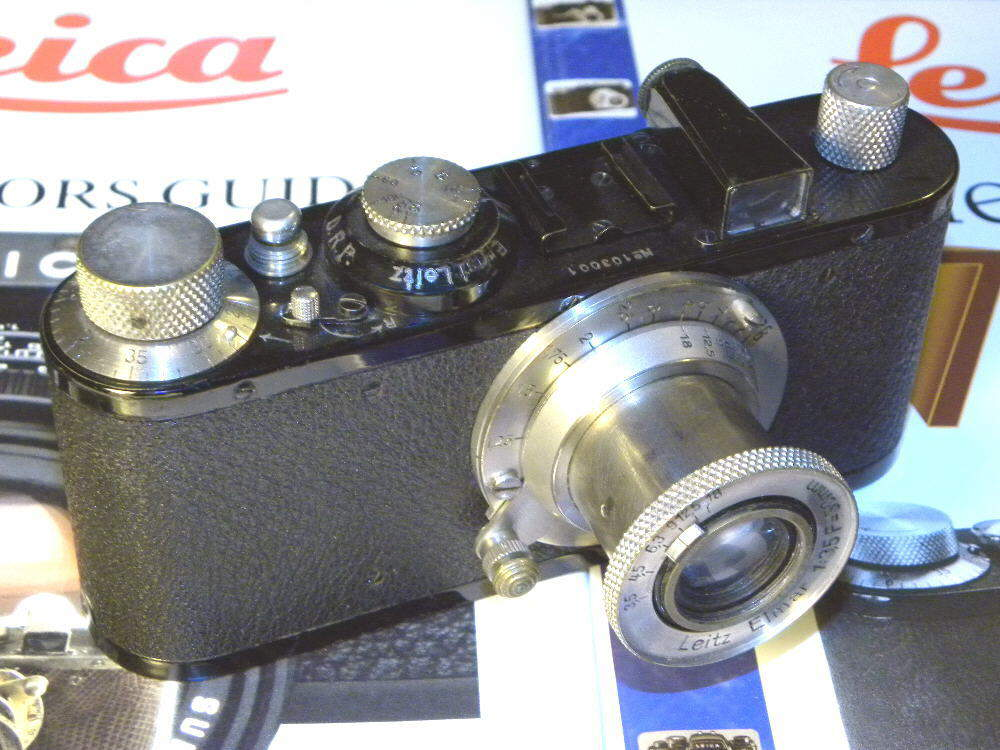

Overview
- Type: 35 mm camera

Lens
- Lens mount: Leica 39 mm

Focusing
- Focus: helical

Exposure/metering
- Exposure: 24 × 36 mm on 35 mm film

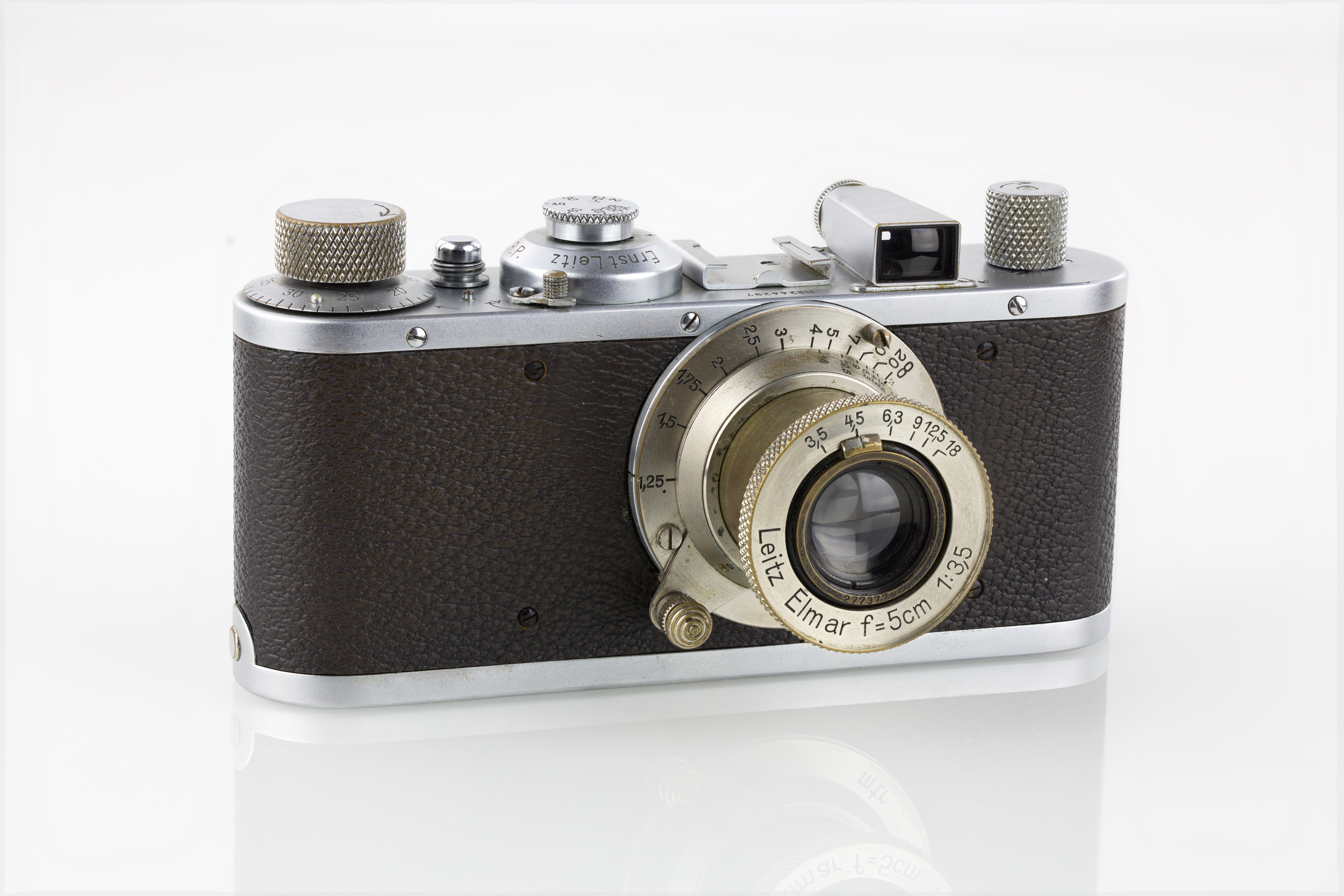
Leica Standard chrome (serial number 244297), 1937, front view

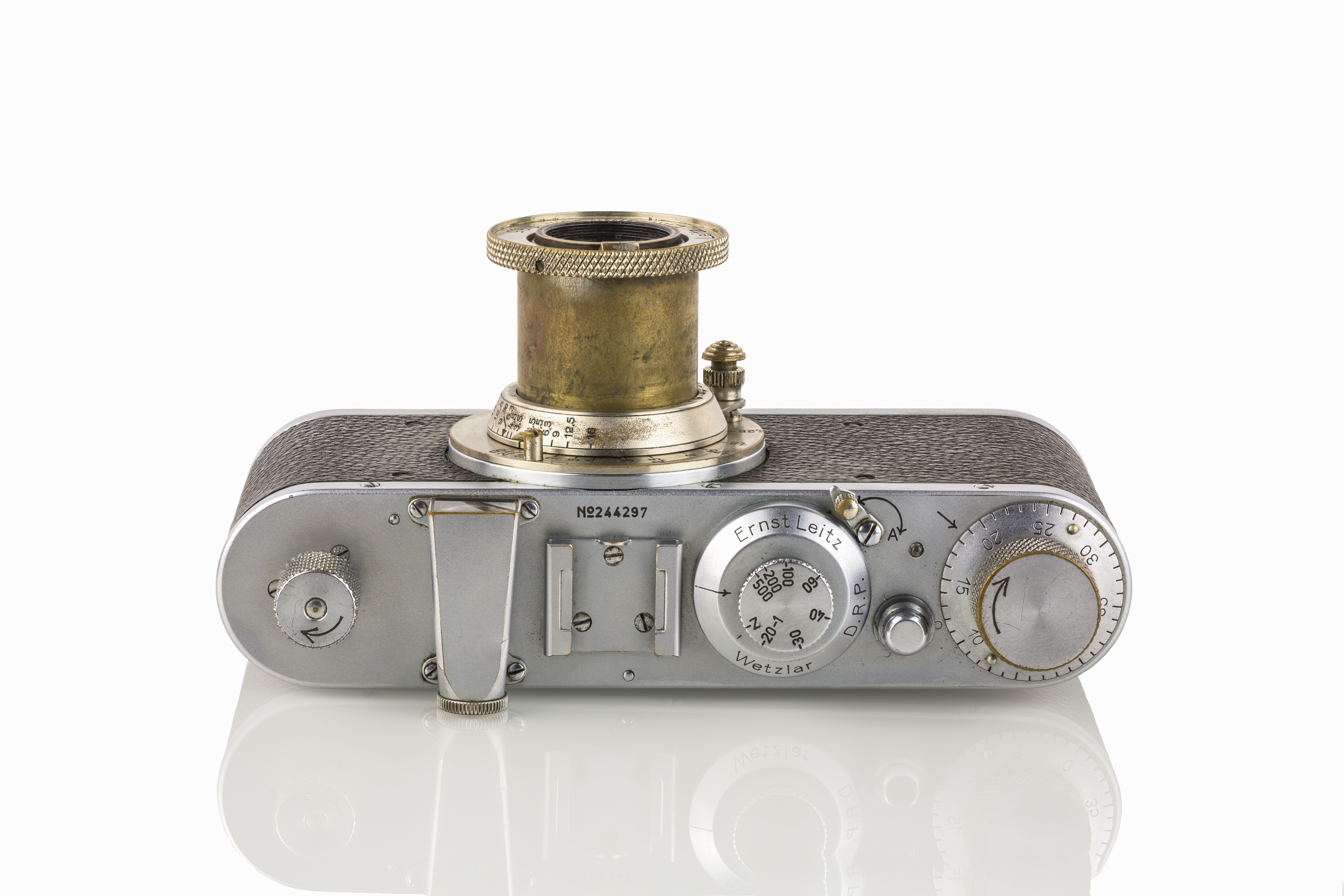
Leica Standard chrome (serial number 244297), 1937, top view

The Leica Standard, Model E was the fourth version of the original 35 mm Leica camera to be launched from Ernst Leitz in Wetzlar, Germany. The concept was conceived by their employee Oskar Barnack in 1913. Production of the camera began in 1925 but it was not until the end of the decade that it was perfected and full-scale production was established.

== History ==
The Leica Standard, Model E was the fourth version of the original 35 mm Leica camera to be launched from Ernst Leitz in Wetzlar, Germany. The concept was conceived by their employee Oskar Barnack in 1913 at which time two prototypes were built. However, it was not until 1924 that Leitz decided to go ahead with the concept and production began the following year. By the end of the decade, the camera had been perfected and full-scale production was established.

The Leica Standard was introduced as a basic model by Ernst Leitz, Wetzlar in October 1932. The camera began production in the same year as the Leica II with a coupled rangefinder. The Leica III with lower shutter speeds was introduced in 1933; this model would later have the faster speed of 1/1000 sec with the IIIa of 1935, though the Leica III would continue in parallel production for several years. All these models use the standardised lens mount with distance from film plane to lens flange fixed to 28.8 mm, a Leitz standard. This feature was first seen on late Leica I model C cameras in 1931, and all Leica II, Model D from 1932, identified by a "0" (zero) stamped on the lens mount flange at the top, to indicate the implementation of the standard, a practice that was continued for some time. It is found on early Leica Standards as well. On the back of these models there is a hole covered by a black plug, presumably for back focus calibration. The original lens for the Leica Standard when introduced was the Leitz Elmar 1:3.5 F=50mm in a collapsible nickel-plated focusing mount with infinity catch.

== Variants ==
The Leica Standard was at first made only in black enamel finish, with nickel-plated lens barrel and camera controls. The only improvement over its predecessor, the Leica I model C, was the smaller-diameter extendible rewind knob. The accessory shoe on the top plate sits exactly above the lens mount for fitting either a rangefinder or an accessory viewfinder. The serial numbering began at 101.001 and continued consecutively to 106.000. These cameras were made between October 1932 and early 1934. By this time, production of chrome-finished Standard cameras had started in small numbers. After 1936, however, most of the production was finished in chrome, and from 1940, the Standard was available in chrome finish only. Not many were made each year after 1940, except that 461 cameras were made in 1947. The Standard camera was replaced in 1949 by the viewfinder-less Leica Ic as the basic camera in the Leica line. Those made after 1945 share body casting with the contemporary models prepared for slow speeds. A disc covers the spot occupied by the slow speed dial found on the other Leica models.

The Standard in its basic version is not a rangefinder camera. However, the black enamelled FOKOS short base rangefinder was made available from the start, as well as a higher ever-ready case accommodating it. The measured subject distance using the rangefinder must be set on the lens' distance scale manually. Some Standard cameras were assembled at Leitz New York during the 1940s from spare parts using Leica III body shells and equipped them with Wollensak lenses. Standard cameras imported from Germany later were also sold with Wollensak lenses. As with all early Leica cameras, Ernst Leitz, Wetzlar offered upgrading customers' cameras when new features were introduced during the course of product development, and it was even possible to upgrade to other models as well. This practice in consequence makes the early models in original condition quite scarce, especially the Standard, which had fewer features than the later models and therefore is more likely to be upgraded.
