= Canon II =

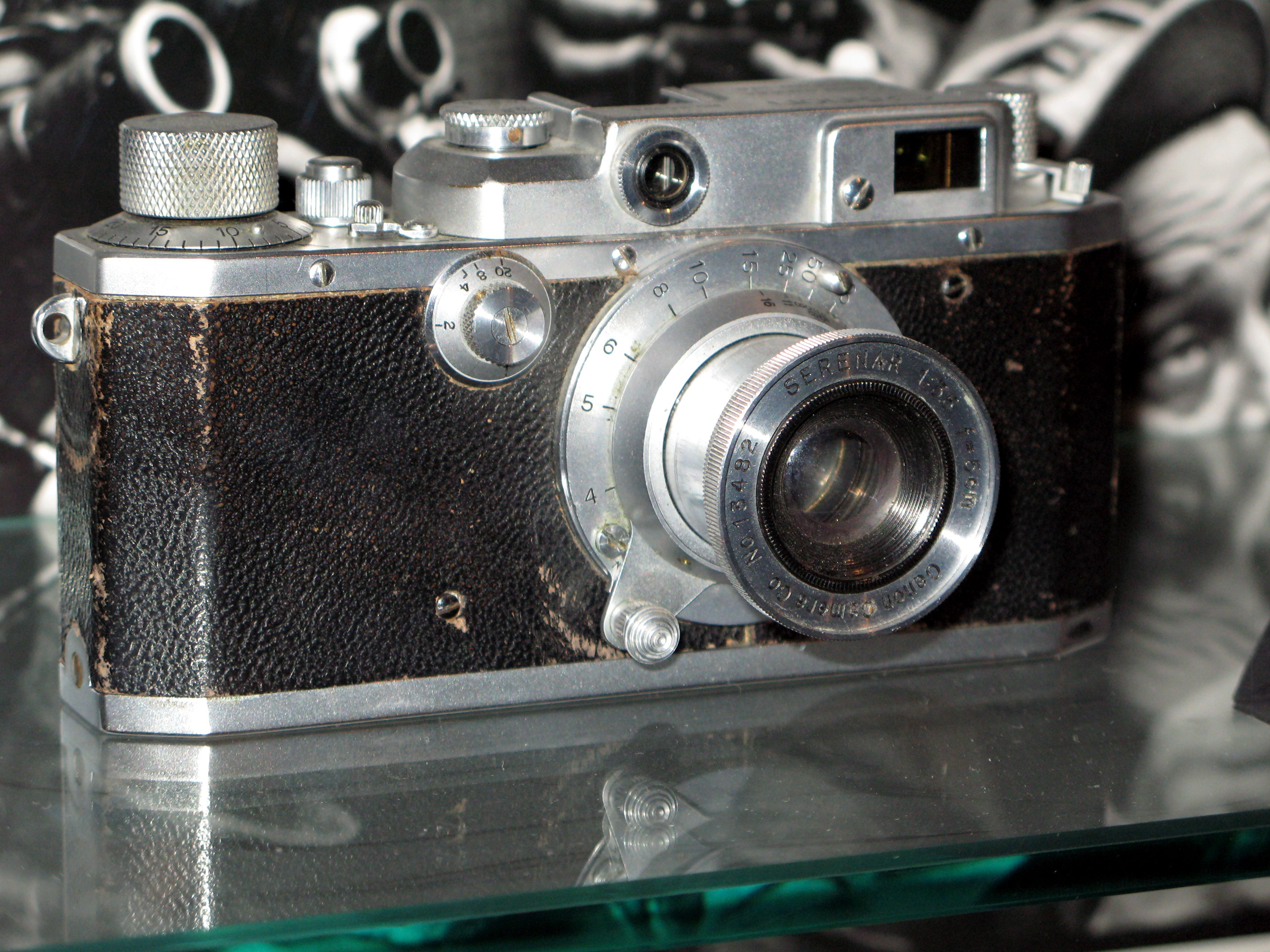

Overview
- Type: 35 mm rangefinder camera

Lens
- Lens mount: Leica screw mount

Focusing
- Focus: manual

Exposure/metering
- Exposure: manual

The Canon rangefinders of the late 1940s and early 1950s are Leica-compatible screw-mount cameras. Many were brought to the U.S. by servicemen who bought them while visiting Japan during the Korean War. Typically these were mounted with a 50mm Serenar (later Canon) lens.

Many of these can still be used, and are similar in function to the Leica III. The top speed is 1/500. Some models are flash synchronized, using Canon's side-rail synch contacts. The lens mount is compatible with all standard Leitz M39 mount lenses

The original ones came with a spring-loaded takeup spool that most photographers found easier to use than the one provided by Leica—many are now missing the spool since the spools were taken for use in Leica cameras.

Unlike many Leica copies, quality control and finish are fully up to Leitz standards.

The noticeable difference between the Canon and other LTM (Leica thread-mount) rangefinders is the angled cornered casing.

Where the Canon cameras surpass the Leica is the finder. Viewfinder and rangefinder are integrated, and a three-way switch allows a view for 50mm, 100mm, and critical rangefinder use. This arrangement made the viewfinders on Canon II/III/IV cameras tend to be dimmer and less brilliant than their counterparts found in Leica or other Barnack-style copy cameras.
