= Yoshihisa Maitani =

Japanese designer (1933–2009)

- 米谷美久
- Maitani c. 1972
- Born: January 8, 1933; Shikoku, Japan
- Died: July 30, 2009 (aged 76)
- Education: Waseda University
- Occupation: Industrial designer
- Years active: 1956–1996
- Employer: Olympus Corporation

Yoshihisa Maitani (Japanese: 米谷美久, Hepburn: Yoshihisa Maitani; January 8, 1933 – July 30, 2009) was an engineer and designer who worked for the Japanese camera manufacturer Olympus Corporation.

After studying mechanical engineering at university, Maitani joined Olympus Optical Co., Ltd. (now Olympus Corporation) in 1956. he went on to work for them for 40 years. He was involved with the design of many of the company's most well-known cameras, including the Pen and the Pen F half frame cameras, the OM System, and the XA.

== Career ==
Maitani credits Eiichi Sakurai, a keen photographer, with shifting Olympus from microscopes to cameras starting in 1935. When he was attending middle and high school, Maitani belonged to a photography club, using the family camera, a Leica IIIf; because he regarded it more as a hobby than a career, he enrolled in Waseda University to study automotive engineering, but continued to spend his free time in photography. After Sakurai learned that Maitani had filed a camera patent as a student, he recruited Maitani to work for Olympus.

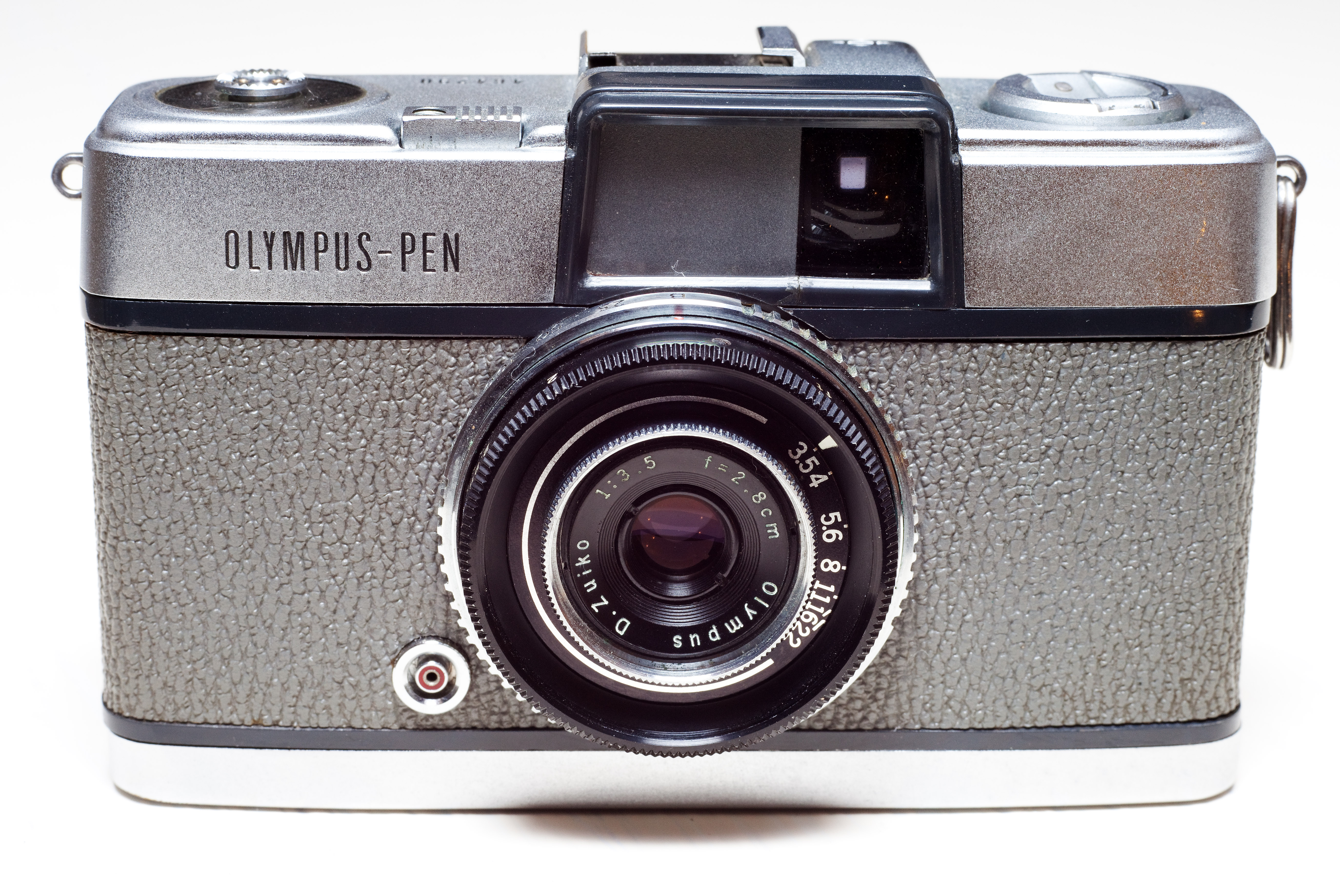
Olympus Pen (1959)

When Maitani started with Olympus, the company sent him to the factory for two years to learn practical aspects of manufacturing before moving to the design department, when he noticed the cheapest camera Olympus sold was ¥23,000, nearly two months' salary, and he began working on a camera that would retail for no more than ¥6,000 instead. Comparing enlargements from his prototype with the Leica IIIf, he was dissatisfied with the sharpness of the lens on the prototype and so he asked the Olympus optical team to design a Tessar-type lens that would equal the quality of the Leica; the resulting D.Zuiko was "really wonderful" but consumed his entire development budget. Using his factory experience, Maitani began cutting costs where he could and upon seeing the finished prototype, Sakurai approved production, but the factory manager refused, calling what would be sold as the Olympus Pen a "toy camera", so manufacturing of the half-frame camera was outsourced instead. At the time, most cameras were manufactured at a rate of a few hundred per month; Maitani set an optimistic production target of 5,000 per month, and the company was astonished to find the camera sold out so quickly.

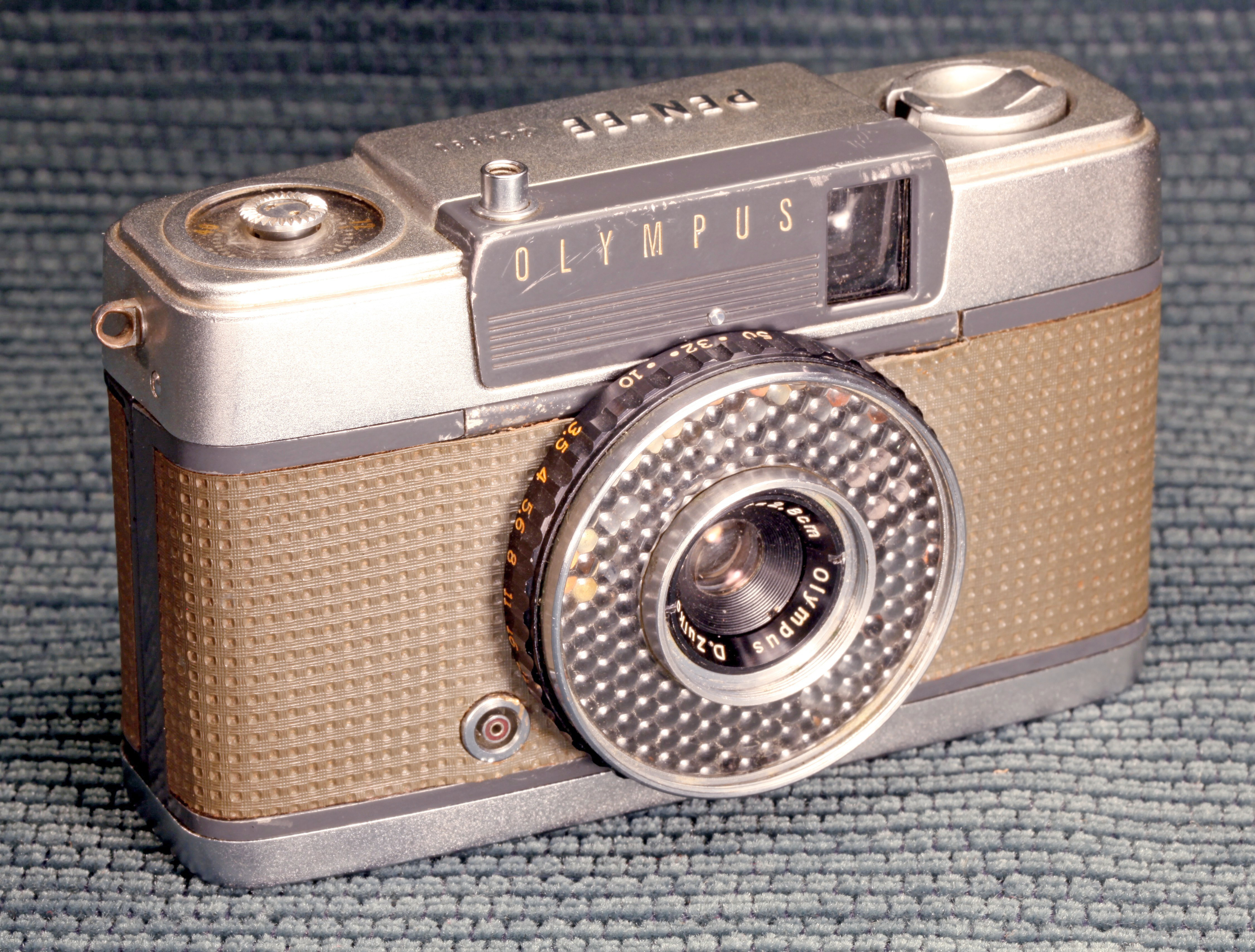
Olympus Pen EE (1961)

The low price also opened a new market for cameras: a month after it launched, Maitani watched a mother photographing her child using a Pen, but he realized that with the settings she had chosen, the picture would not be in focus, so he next designed a prototype with simplified controls, requiring just a single button press. The head of the sales department argued with Maitani over this philosophy, believing that real photographers required many controls and fearing that such a simple camera would not sell. After completing the prototype, the head of sales played with the camera for half an hour in silence, then enthusiastically encouraged production to start, resulting in the Pen EE.

Olympus Pen F (1963)

At the time the Pen launched, Maitani believed there would not be a market for a half-frame single-lens reflex camera, but began developing some of the key technologies that would be required, including a mirror that swung sideways and a rotary focal plane shutter. After the Pen became a success, Sakurai approached Maitani and told him that photographers were asking if a Pen SLR was possible; when Maitani showed him the design sketches and explained how it would result in a SLR with an unconventional shape, Sakurai was initially surprised, then approved the development project, which resulted in the Olympus Pen F. To achieve acceptable shutter speeds, many patents were awarded for the titanium shutter and hardened gear train. Maitani called it "a huge failure" because the patents prevented any other companies from making competitive cameras.

Because Kodak refused to create half-frame slide mounts, the American market for the Pen F was limited, and the head of exports began pressuring Maitani to develop a full-frame SLR. As a small company, Olympus could not afford to continue both the half-frame and full-frame programs, so initially the sales department began exploring the possibility of rebadging another manufacturer's products. Maitani was aghast: why would anyone buy a camera rebadged as an Olympus when they could simply buy the original camera instead?

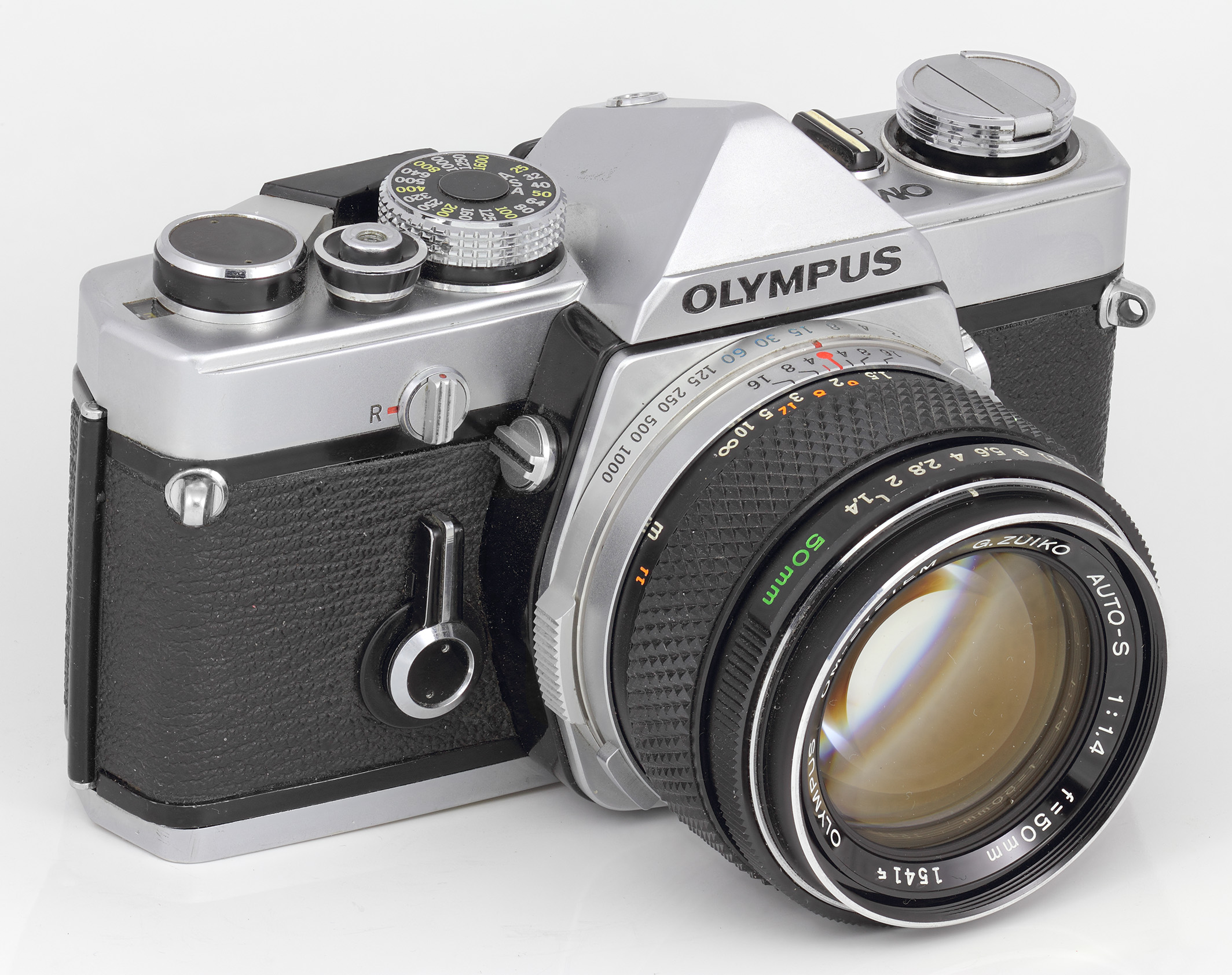
Olympus OM-1 (1972)

After Maitani had used SLRs reluctantly for macro photography, as the Leica were not optimized for that use, Maitani realized that SLR weight and size posed another barrier to broad acceptance; by the end of 1967, he had convinced Sakurai to pursue a small, light SLR. Maitani set a target of half: 700 g (25 oz) and 20% reduction in height and depth, resulting in a camera that would be approximately half the weight and volume of a Nikon F. To optimize the utilization of internal space, the shutter speed control was moved to the lens mount. The resulting Olympus M-1, later renamed OM-1, had come about through a process that Maitani called his "unreasonable demand to reduce the size and weight by half", adding that "repetitions of this process eventually led to the creation of something that photographers want, something that I wanted. If something is not available to buy, you have to make it yourself." A few years later, Olympus released the OM-2, which used an electronically-timed shutter and exposure meter that measured light reflected from the film.

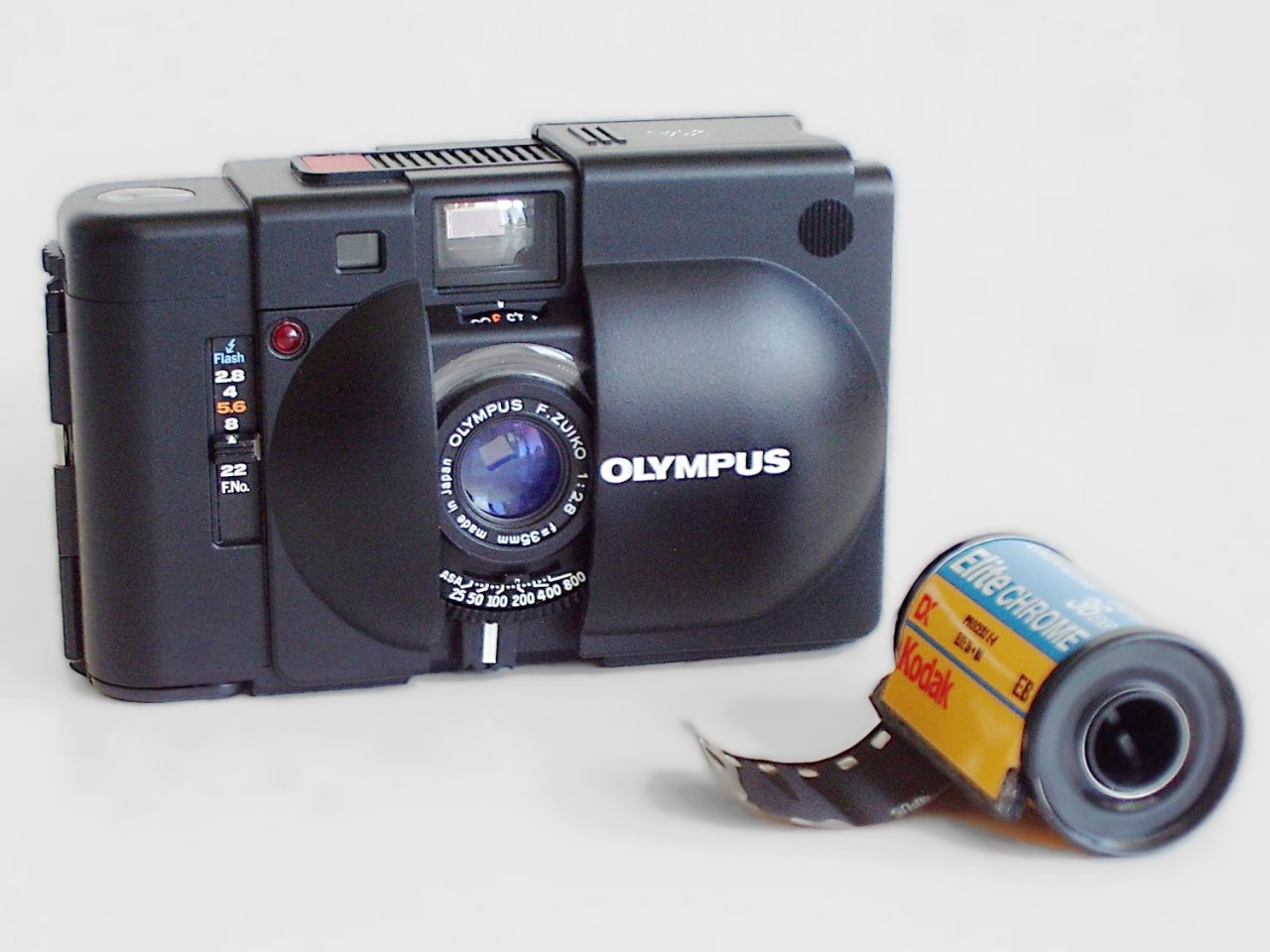
Olympus XA (1979), with film cartridge for size

After the OM-2, Olympus's market share for 35mm compact cameras began to fall and Maitani was enlisted to help design a new product. He assembled of team of 10 to brainstorm ideas; after one year, the team reported back they had 100 concepts but were impressed by the Konica C35 AF, which had just been released, and wanted to produce a competitor. Maitani dismissed that idea and told them if they liked the Konica that much, he would buy one for each of them; instead, he urged them to revisit the 100 concepts, but they could not come up with one he found satisfactory, so he started with the idea of a full-frame camera that could be carried everywhere, setting dimensional limits based on the size of a 135 film cartridge and eliminating the need for a case and lens cap. These rough concepts were developed eventually into the Olympus XA, which was the first camera to win a Good Design Award.

Many of the cameras that I have developed have been unique Olympus-style products. And there's a reason for that. I was simply trying to make things that you couldn't buy anywhere.
When the Monkey King boasted that he could fly to the end of the Earth, the Buddha told him to go. And indeed he flew to the end of the Earth and returned after signing his name on the wall. When he got back, the Buddha smiled and showed him the inside of his finger. "Here is your signature," he said. If you think about it, everything is in the hand of the Buddha.
I love cameras, and I have willfully proclaimed my determination to create cameras that have never existed before. Yet when I think about it now, it seems to be that everything was in the hand of Olympus. I'm sure that Olympus will continue to create unique cameras, and that those who love Olympus cameras will remain loyal users. Olympus cameras are a little unusual, but I hope that you will continue to understand and support those cameras.

— Yoshihisa Maitani, Special Lecture (Nov 2005)

In 1978, the United States distributor, Olympus Camera Corporation, began lobbying Olympus to approve a planned series of advertisements that would feature Maitani prominently, similar to how contemporaneous campaigns made automotive designers into household names. In October 1979, Maitani relented, on the condition the ads were limited to the American market only, and the ads, crediting him as a mononymous genius, were running by early 1980.

Although some have credited Maitani with the design of the Olympus Stylus (1991), that camera was designed by Tatsuya Suzuki, incorporating some of the basic concepts from the XA, including the capless, caseless design. Maitani retired from Olympus in 1996.
