= Olympus 35RD =

Olympus 35 RD
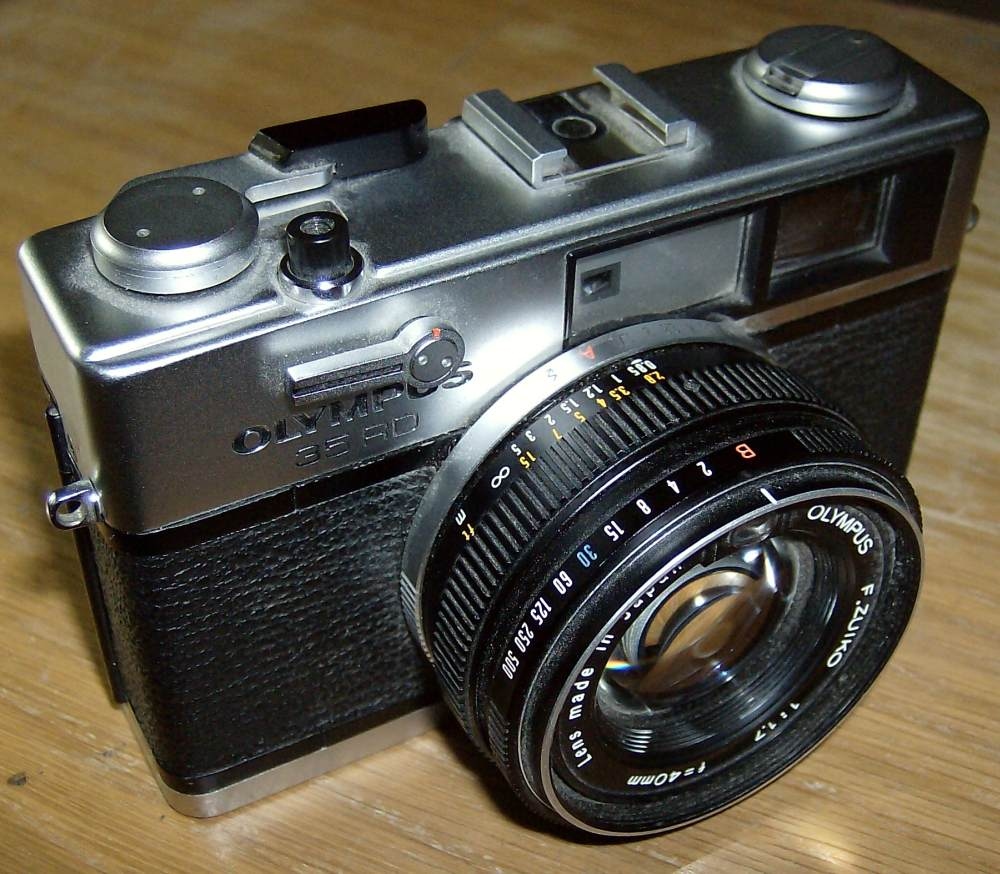
- Olympus 35 RD

Overview
- Maker: Olympus Optical Co. Ltd.
- Type: 35mm rangefinder camera
- Released: 1975

Lens
- Lens mount: fixed lens
- Lens: F. Zuiko f/1.7 6 elements

Sensor/medium
- Film format: 35mm
- Film size: 36 mm x 24 mm

Focusing
- Focus: Manual focus, coupled rangefinder

Exposure/metering
- Exposure: Shutter priority, manual override

Flash
- Flash: External hot shoe, PC connector

General
- Dimensions: 114×70×57 mm (4.5×2.8×2.2 in)
- Weight: 482 g (482 g)
- Made in: Japan

The Olympus 35 RD is a 35 mm rangefinder camera manufactured by Olympus in Japan in the 1970s.

== Specification ==
- Lens: 40mm F. Zuiko f/1.7 6 elements
- Focus range: 0.85 meters (2.8 feet) to infinity
- Shutter-speed: B, 1/2, 1/4, 1/8 1/15, 1/30, 1/60, 1/125, 1/250, 1/500
- Aperture: 1.7, 2, 2.8, 4, 5.6, 8, 11, 16
- Exposure modes: metered shutter-preferred automatic exposure, unmetered-manual override and flashmatic modes. When in automatic mode, the shutter will not fire if there is insufficient light.
- Filter size: 49mm
- Film speed scale: ASA 25–800
- Size: 11.4 cm × 7 cm × 5.7 cm (4 1/2 in × 2 3/4 in × 2 1/4 in)
- Weight: 482 grams (17.0 ounces)

== See also ==
- List of Olympus products
- Olympus 35RC
- Olympus 35SP
- Olympus XA
