= Olympus 35RC =

Olympus 35 RC
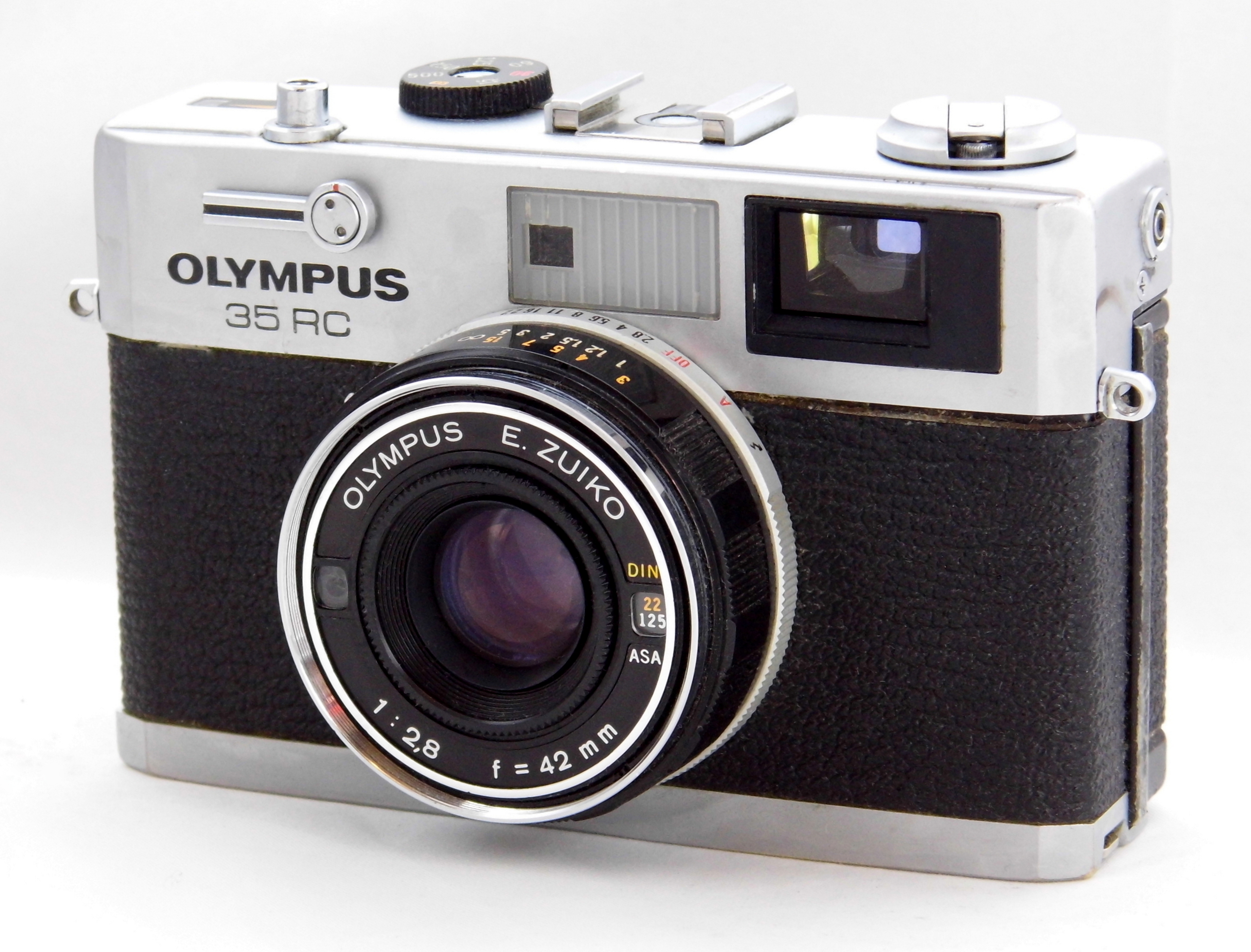
- Olympus 35 RC

Overview
- Maker: Olympus Optical Co. Ltd.
- Type: 35mm rangefinder camera
- Released: 1970

Lens
- Lens mount: fixed lens
- Lens: E. Zuiko 42mm f/2.8, 5 elements in 4 groups

Sensor/medium
- Film format: 35mm
- Film size: 36 mm x 24 mm

Focusing
- Focus: Manual focus, coupled rangefinder

Exposure/metering
- Exposure: Shutter priority, manual override

Flash
- Flash: External hot shoe, PC connector

General
- Dimensions: 110×70×50 mm (4.3×2.8×2.0 in)
- Weight: 410 g (410 g)
- Made in: Japan

The Olympus 35 RC is a 35 mm rangefinder camera manufactured by Olympus in Japan in the 1970s. It claimed to be the smallest 35 mm rangefinder with automatic exposure control and manual override. Its viewfinder readouts for selected aperture/shutter speed settings are unique for a compact camera, later reiterated in the 35RD.

== Specification ==
- Lens: E. Zuiko 42mm f/2.8 5 elements in 4 groups
- Focus range: 0.9 meters to infinity
- Shutter-speed: B, 1/15, 1/30, 1/60, 1/125, 1/250, 1/500
- Aperture: 2.8, 4, 5.6, 8, 11, 16, 22
- Exposure modes: metered shutter-preferred automatic exposure, unmetered-manual override and flashmatic modes
- Filter size: 43.5mm
- Film speed scale: ASA 25–800
- Size: 11 × 7 × 5 cm (4 1/4" × 2 3/4" × 1 15/16")
- Weight: 410 grams

== See also ==
- List of Olympus products
- Olympus 35RD
- Olympus 35SP
- Olympus XA
