= Olympus 35SP =

Film camera

Olympus 35 SP
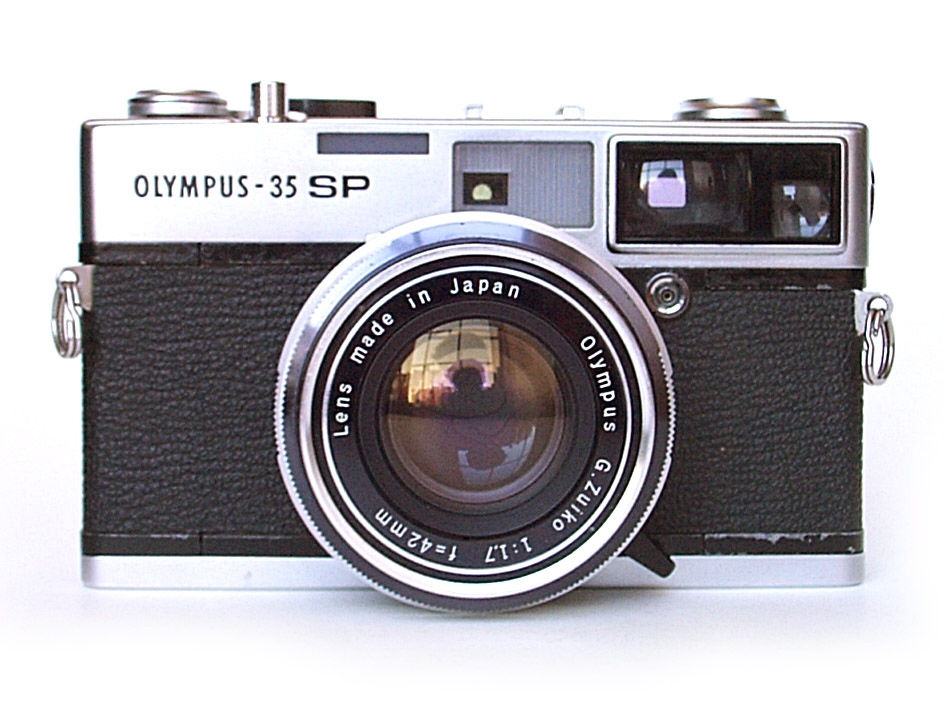
- Olympus 35 SP

Overview
- Maker: Olympus Optical Co. Ltd.
- Released: 1969

Lens
- Lens mount: fixed lens
- Lens: G. Zuiko f/1.7, 42 mm, 7 elements in 5 groups

Focusing
- Focus: Manual focus, coupled rangefinder

Exposure/metering
- Exposure: Shutter priority, manual override

Flash
- Flash: External hot shoe, PC connector

General
- Dimensions: 129×76×61 mm (5.1×3.0×2.4 in)
- Weight: 600 g (21 oz)
- Made in: Japan

The Olympus 35 SP is a 35 mm rangefinder camera made by Olympus in Japan. It is the only 35 mm rangefinder with a dual center-weighted average metering and spot metering system. Metering is also available in manual mode, which is quite unusual amongst Japanese rangefinder cameras of this era. The uncoupled meter gives light readings in exposure values within the viewfinder which is then translated to exposure settings around the lens of the camera. It was succeeded by smaller cameras such as the 35RC and 35RD before Olympus pivoted to SLR cameras for the prosumer/professional market.

== Specification ==
- Lens: G. Zuiko f/1.7, 42 mm, 7 elements in 5 groups
- Aperture Range: f/1.7–22 for auto mode, f/1.7–16 for manual mode
- Shutter Speeds: B, 1/15-1/250s for auto mode, 1–1/500s for manual mode
- Focus Range: .85 meters (2.8 feet)–infinity
- Automatic Exposure Control: Fully automatic program exposure, EV 5.5–17 in ISO 100
- Exposure Meter: CdS type dual system, center-weighted or 6 degree spot metering, EV 3–17 in manual mode
- Filter Size: 49 mm
- Film Speed Scale: ASA 25–800
- Size: 129 mm × 76 mm × 61 mm (5.1 in × 3.0 in × 2.4 in)
- Weight: 600 grams (21 ounces)
- Battery: PX625 1.35 volt mercury cell

== See also ==
- List of Olympus products
- Olympus 35RC
- Olympus 35RD
- Olympus XA
