= XA =

XA, xA, or xa may refer to:

== Finance ==
- Athens Stock Exchange, often abbreviated as ΧΑ in Greek

== Organizations ==
- Chi Alpha, a Christian college group
- Golden Dawn (political party), from the Greek initials

== Technology ==
=== Computing ===
- X/Open XA, a standard for distributed database transactions
- ".xa". or ".XA", an audio file extensions used in the PlayStation and PSone
- CD-ROM XA, an extension to the CD-ROM storage format
- A Maxis proprietary audio format used by games The Sims and SimCity 3000

=== Aerospace ===
- XA, aircraft registration prefix for Mexican commercial aircraft
- XA, United States aircraft designator for Experimental Attack

=== Other technologies ===
- Scion xA, a car
- Fantom-X, a synthesizer made by Roland Corporation
- Olympus XA, a camera

== Other ==
- xA, expected assists, performance metric
- Xã, a rural commune, a third-level administrative subdivision in Vietnam
- XA, acronym of American rock band X Ambassadors
