= Canon VT =

Rangefinder camera released in 1956

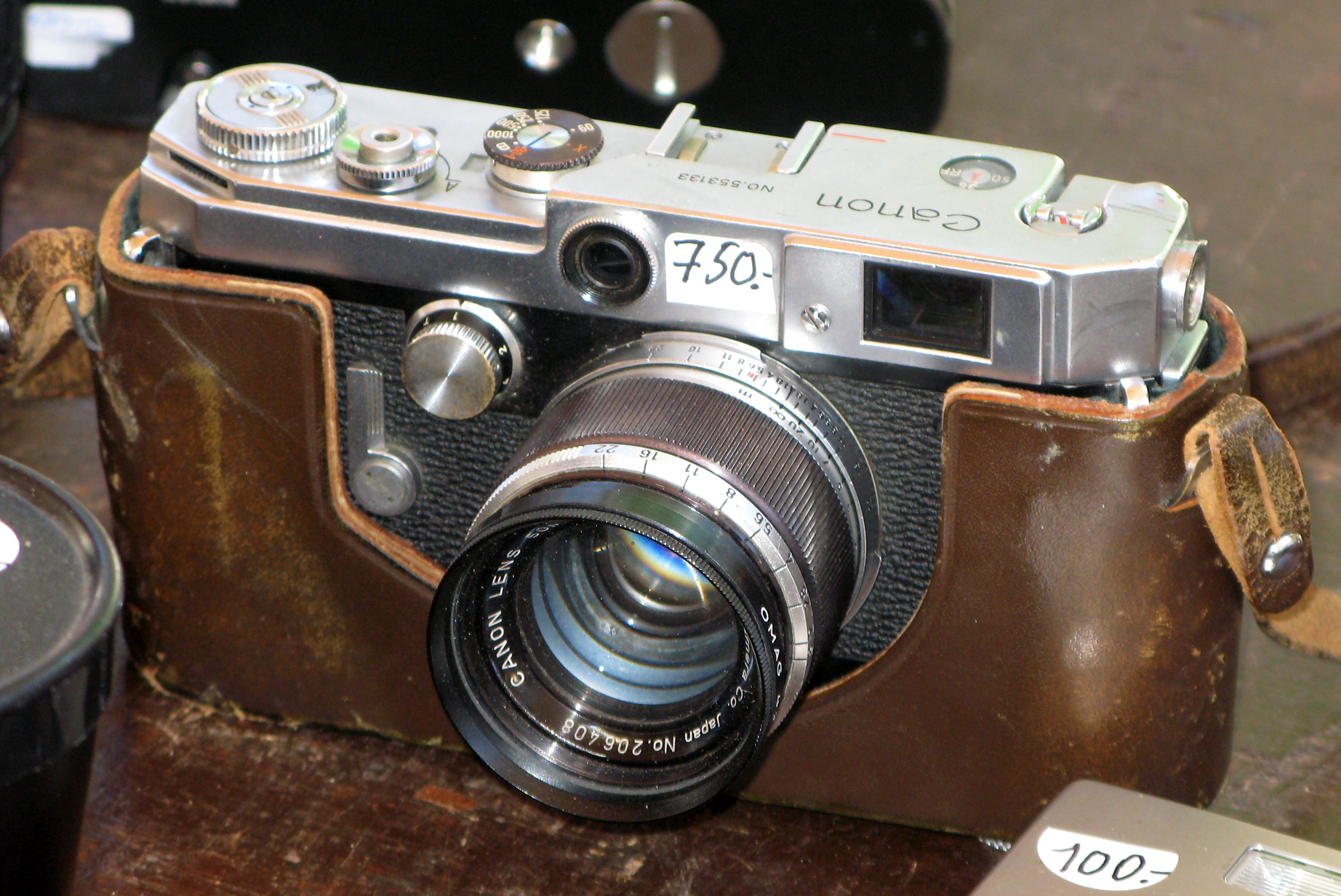

Overview
- Maker: Canon Inc.
- Type: 35mm rangefinder camera

Lens
- Lens mount: M39 Leica screw mount

Focusing
- Focus: manual

Exposure/metering
- Exposure: manual

The Canon VT is a rangefinder camera released by Canon in 1956. Until then, Canon had a history of making slightly modified Leica copies. The release of the VT showed for the first time that Canon could be a leader in 35mm rangefinder design.

Canon kept the Leica screw mount on the VT, and little else. They changed the film advance from a top-mounted knob to a bottom-mounted trigger. The tripod socket was moved to mount a trigger wind grip. They added a swing-open back making the camera easier to load than previous bottom loading Canons.

The VT had a focal-plane shutter with a cloth curtain; shutter speeds were from 1s to 1/1000, plus T and B. Available Canon lenses ranged from 25mm to 800mm, with some as fast as f/1.2. FP, M, and X flash synchronisation was supported.

It had a three-position viewfinder with rotating prisms, which could be set to 35mm, 50mm and RF. In the RF setting, accessory shoe-mounted viewfinders with automatic parallax correction would be used.

== See also ==
- Canon 39mm screw lenses
