= Leica 250 Reporter =

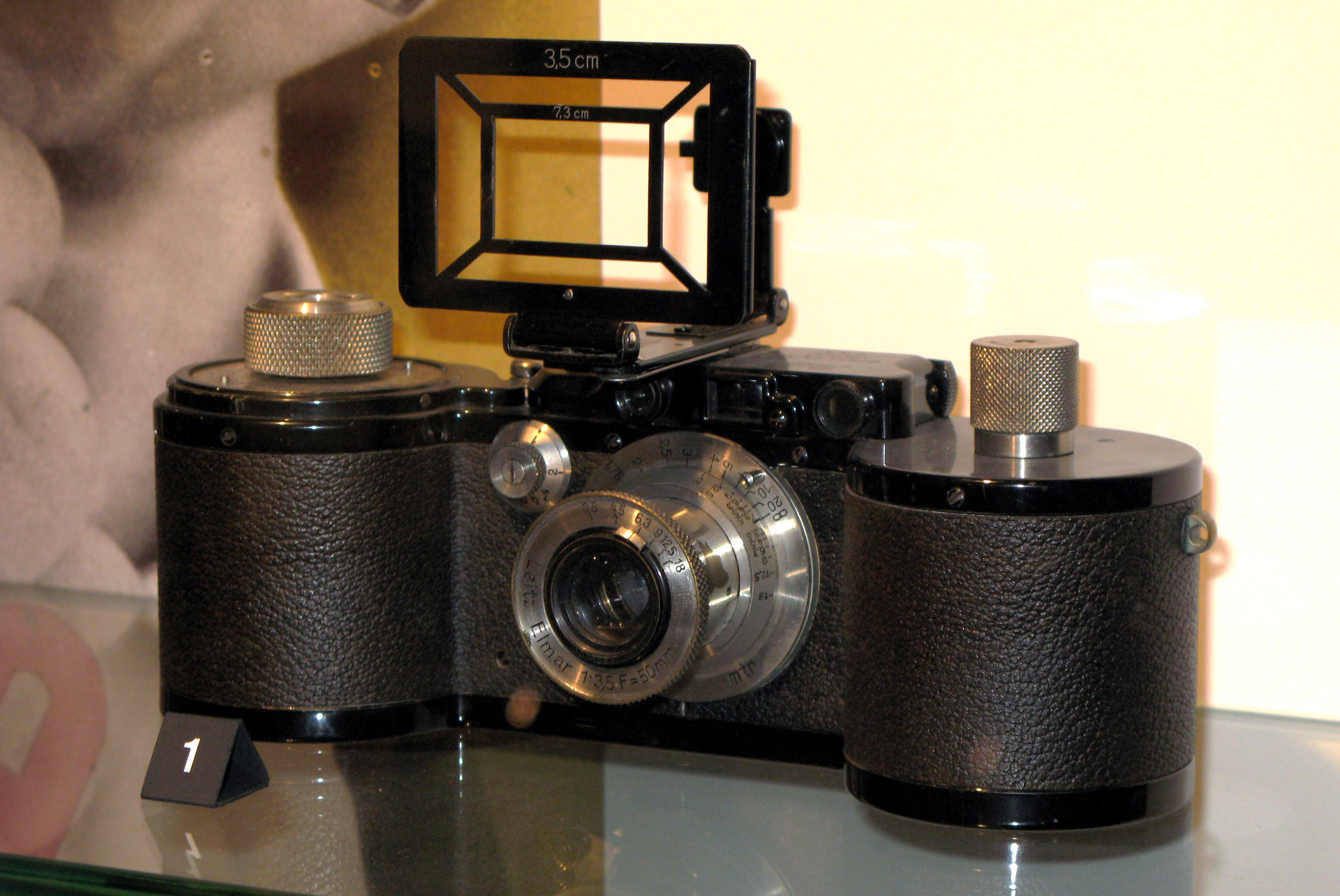

Overview
- Type: 35 mm rangefinder camera

Lens
- Lens mount: Leica screw mount

Focusing
- Focus: manual

Exposure/metering
- Exposure: manual

Flash
- Flash: cold shoe

The Leica 250 Reporter is a body variant of the Leica screw mount rangefinder. It was designed to take bulk film by rolls of 10 metres, allowing 250 exposures. The film was charged in special film cassettes (code KOOBF).

Two prototypes Leica 250 DD were made based on the Leica II. According to Luigi Crescenzi in Classic Camera issue 19, s/n 114051 was later modified to a 250 GG and s/n 114052 still exists (in chrome finish).

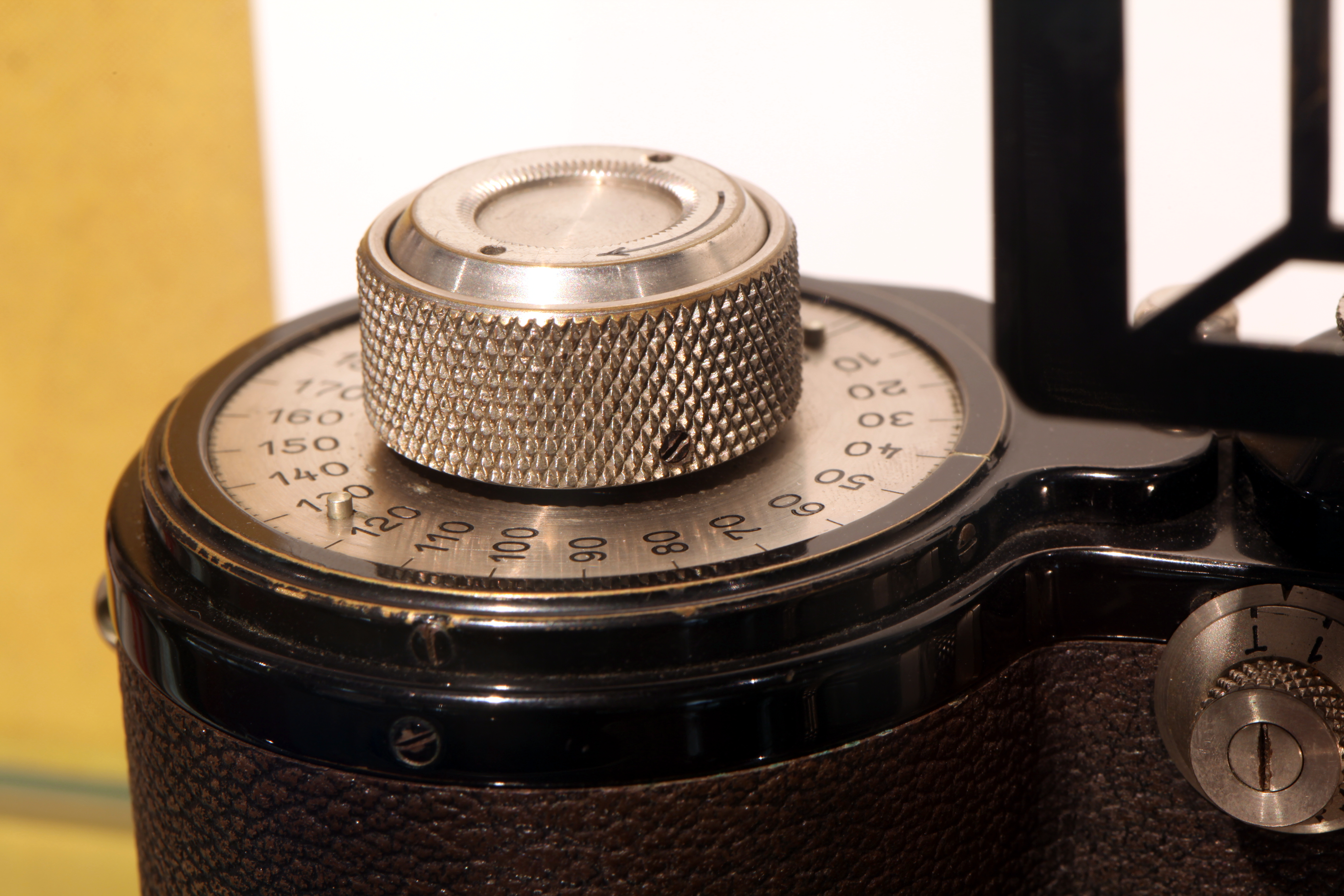
Close-up of the frame counter

The Leica 250 FF was based on the Leica III, with slow speeds, and the Leica 250 GG on the Leica IIIa, with 1/1000 top speed. Most were black but some existed in chrome. Less than 1,000 were made. There were many small variations: some had no slow speeds, some were coupled to a motor drive.

Independent craftspeople have modified ordinary Leica cameras to load bulk film. The work can vary from crude to excellent, but these are not Leica 250 Reporters.
