= Eiichi Sakurai =

Japanese photographer and mechanical engineer

Eiichi Sakurai (桜井栄一, Sakurai Eiichi; 1909–1998) was a renowned Japanese photographer and a mechanical engineer. He graduated from Tokyo University Technology Department with a mechanical engineering degree, and soon after was recruited by Takachiho Works Co., Ltd.(predecessor to Olympus Optical Co., Ltd.) in 1935, as a member of the project team who developed their first camera. In 1937, he designed the famed Olympus Standard, a rangefinder camera which was using 127 film format. Later he became Director and Head of the Camera Development Division of Olympus, and personally invited Yoshihisa Maitani to join the company in 1956. He retired of the company as senior executive director in 1974. He is most remembered for his work as an amateur photographer, receiving in 1965 the "Distinguished Contributions Award" from the Photographic Society of Japan for his long career and contributions to Japanese Photography. He also held a successful exhibition at the Art Institute of Chicago (from November 23, 1981, to January 10, 1982) where part of his work is presently preserved.
