= Leica II =

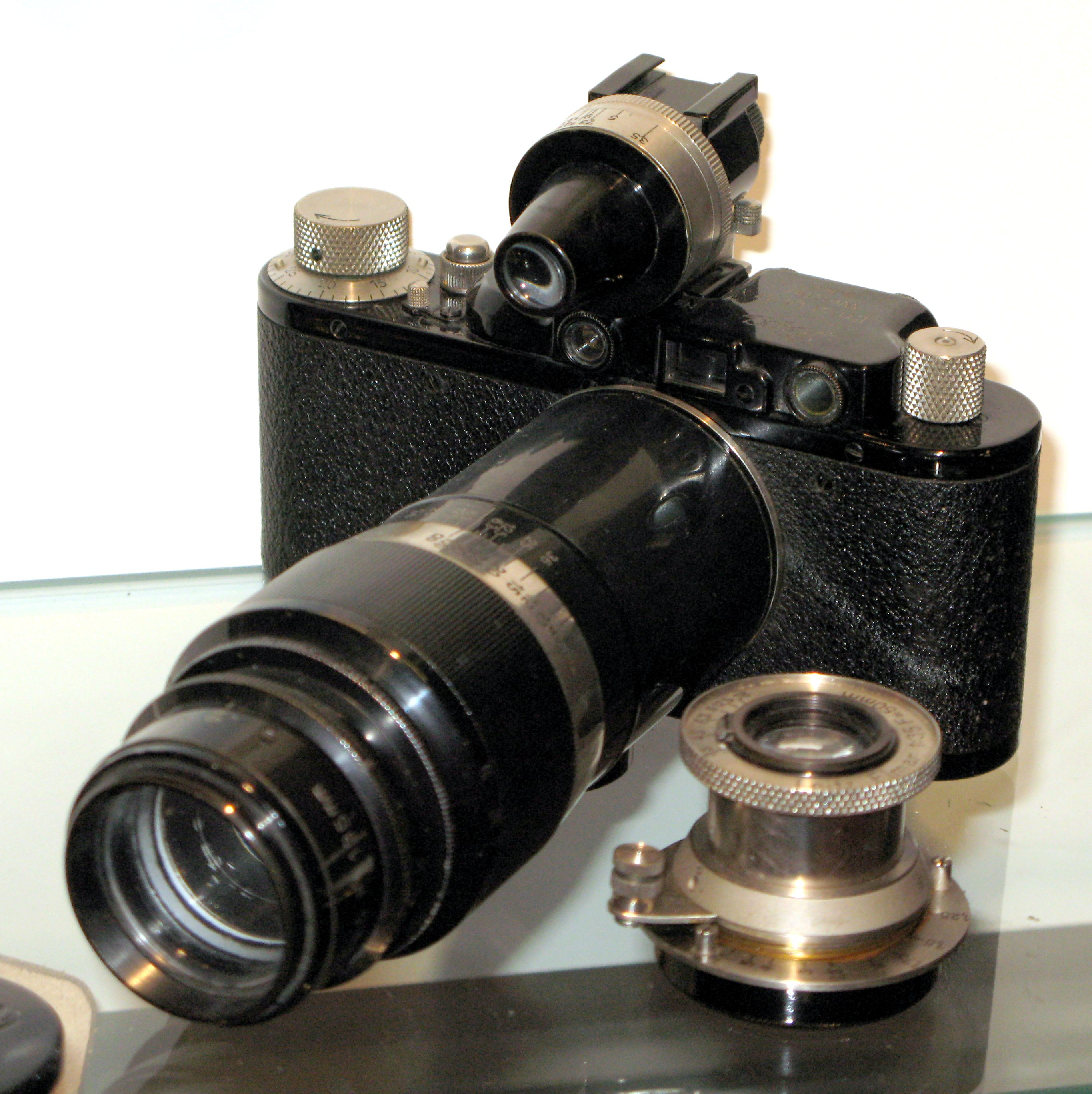

Overview
- Maker: Leica Camera
- Type: 35 mm rangefinder camera

Lens
- Lens mount: M39 lens mount

Focusing
- Focus: manual

Exposure/metering
- Exposure: manual

Flash
- Flash: cold shoe

The Leica II is a Barnack rangefinder camera introduced by Leica in 1932. They were the first Leica cameras with a built-in rangefinder. Several models were produced over the years, in parallel with the Leica III series from 1933.

The Leica II uses a coupled rangefinder distinct from the viewfinder. The viewfinder is set for a 50 mm lens; using shorter or longer lenses requires installing an alternate viewfinder on the accessory socket. (Note: Unification of the rangefinder and the viewfinder occurred with the introduction of the Leica M3, allowing quick framing and focusing in a single operation. The M3 viewfinder is also able to display viewlines for 50, 90 and 135 mm lenses)

A mere four copies of the gold-plated Leica Luxus II were made. In 2013, one sold at auction in Hong Kong for HK$4 million, after featuring on the BBC's Antiques Roadshow programme. The whereabouts of the other three models are not recorded.

The popular Soviet camera, the FED 1, was a clone of the Leica II.

Leica II models
Model name	Manufacturing dates	Features or improvements
Leica D (Leica II)	1932–1948	like III but without slow speeds on frontal dial
Leica IIc	1948–1951	Die-cast body like the IIIc
Leica 250 DD	–	Leica II-based Leica 250 Reporter
Leica IIf	1951–1956	Similar to the IIIf, without the slow speed dial
