= M39 lens mount =

Standard lens mount for cameras

M39
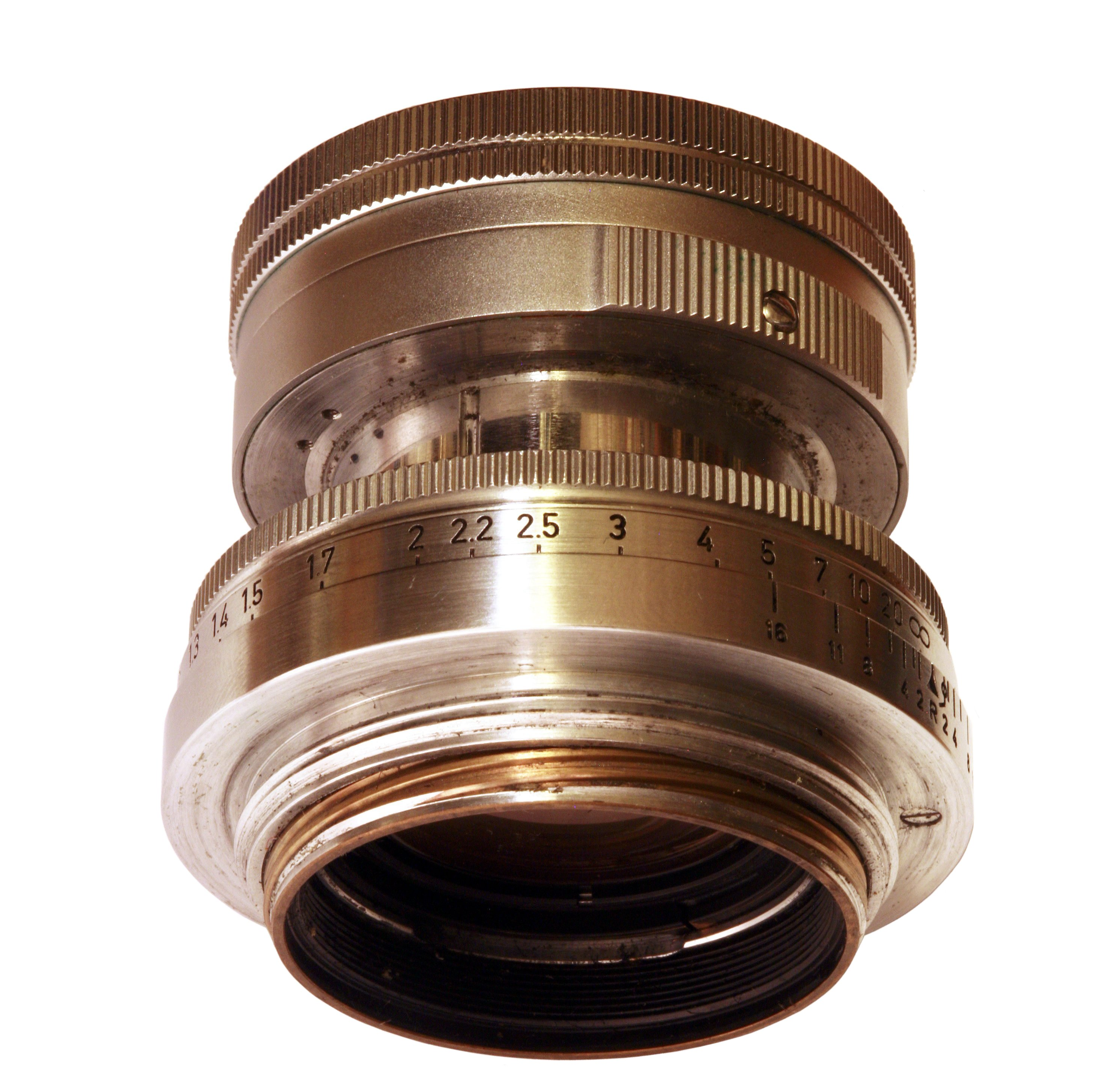
- Leitz Summicron 50 mm in M39 lens mount
- Type: Screw
- External diameter: 39 mm
- Inner diameter: N/A
- Tabs: N/A
- Flange: 28.8 mm
- Connectors: Telemeter coupling

The M39 lens mount is a screw thread mounting system for attaching lenses to 35 mm cameras, primarily rangefinder (RF) Leicas. It is also the most common mount for photographic enlarger lenses.

True Leica Thread-Mount (LTM) is 39 mm in diameter and has a thread of 26 turns-per-inch or threads-per-inch (tpi) (approximately 0.977 mm pitch) of Whitworth thread form. Whitworth threads were then the norm in microscope manufacture. The Royal Microscopical Society (RMS) thread, also known as society thread, is a special 0.8" diameter x 36 tpi Whitworth thread used for microscope objective lenses and Leitz was a major manufacturer of microscopes, so the tooling at the plant was already set up to produce the Whitworth thread form. The Soviets in the 1930s produced their early FED cameras in M39×1 (39 mm by 1 mm DIN thread). Early Canon cameras also used a different M39 × 24 tpi thread mount, called "J-mount".

True LTM lenses have a flange focal distance of 28.8 mm, though this is of little importance for lenses used on bellows enlargers.

The LTM mount was later adopted for the Soviet Zenit single-lens-reflex (SLR) cameras, though with the longer optical registration of 45.2 mm, required to allow the mirror room to flip out of the focal path when a picture was taken.

The mount was developed by Oskar Barnack at Leica to provide a system that would allow for the exchange of lenses on their new small film cameras (Leica Type 1 and Leica Type 2), as Zeiss Ikon had indicated that their forthcoming Contax rangefinder cameras would have interchangeable lenses. The LTM system was tested at the request of Leitz on lenses manufactured in small batches by Hugo Meyer in Germany and marketed with a run of Leitz cameras by A. O. Roth in London. The test marketing program was a success, so regular production with Leitz camera bodies and lenses was introduced on the Leica II, and featured on the Leica Standard and Leica III.

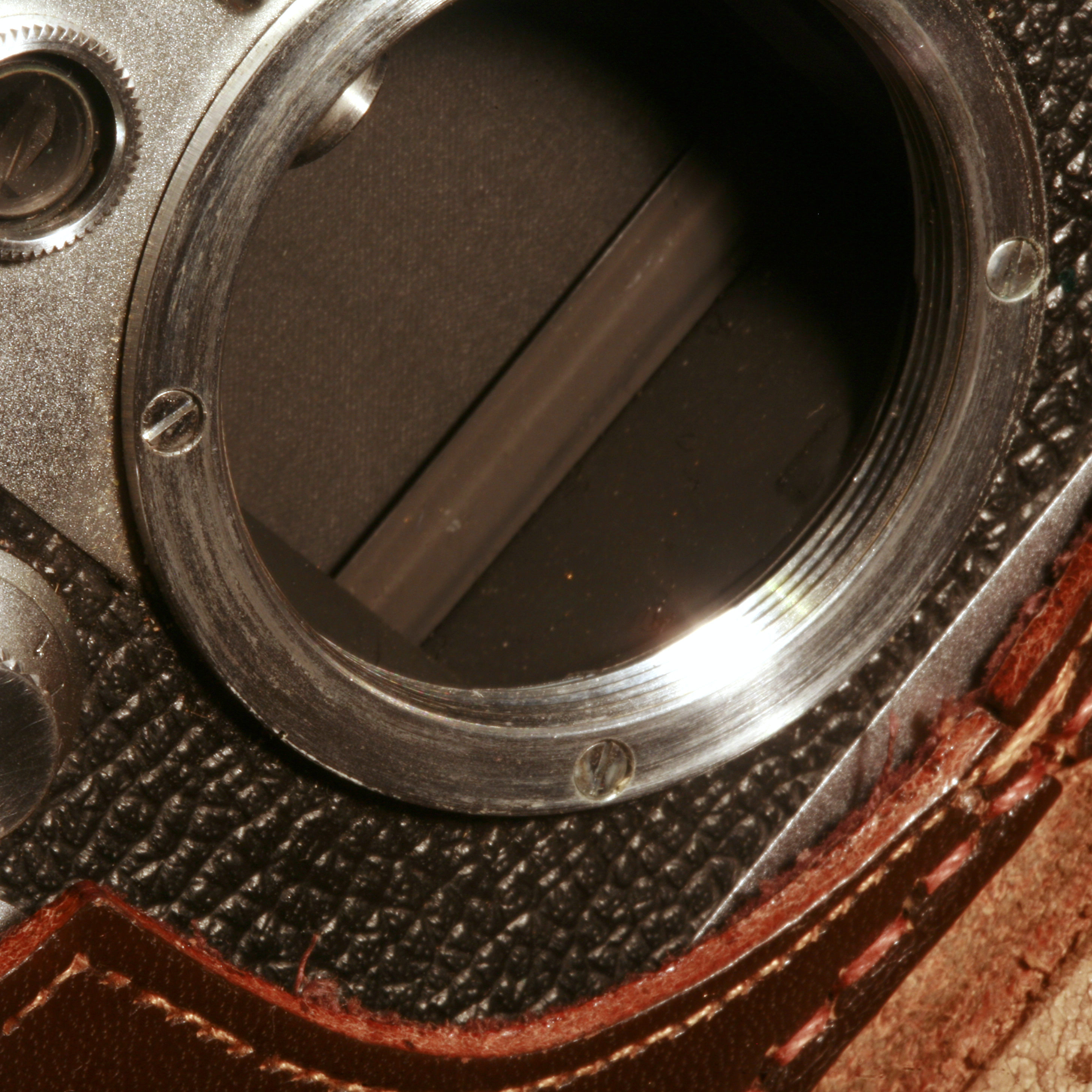
Detail of the mounting of a Leica IIIf

Until the 1950s the 39 mm mount was the norm for exchangeable lenses in rangefinder cameras. The high cost of quality lenses led to the dual use camera/enlarger of the lenses, hence the fact that enlargers also accept 39 mm lenses.

Currently, Cosina in Japan — many of whose recent products are marketed under the Voigtländer brand — and FED in Ukraine continue to produce camera bodies using a true Leica thread-mount. Adaptors are available to use M39 lenses with mirrorless digital cameras, such as Sony E-mount, Canon RF-mount or Nikon Z-mount cameras.

== See also ==
- Leica M mount
- M42 lens mount

== Sources ==
- Leica vs. Soviet mounts & focus
- (in Russian) Standard: GOST 10332-63
- (in Russian) Standard: GOST 10332-72
- Marc James Small. Non-Leitz Leica Thread-Mount Lenses: a 39mm Diversity. Rita Wittig, 1995.
