= Leica III =

Rangefinder 35mm camera (1933–1960)

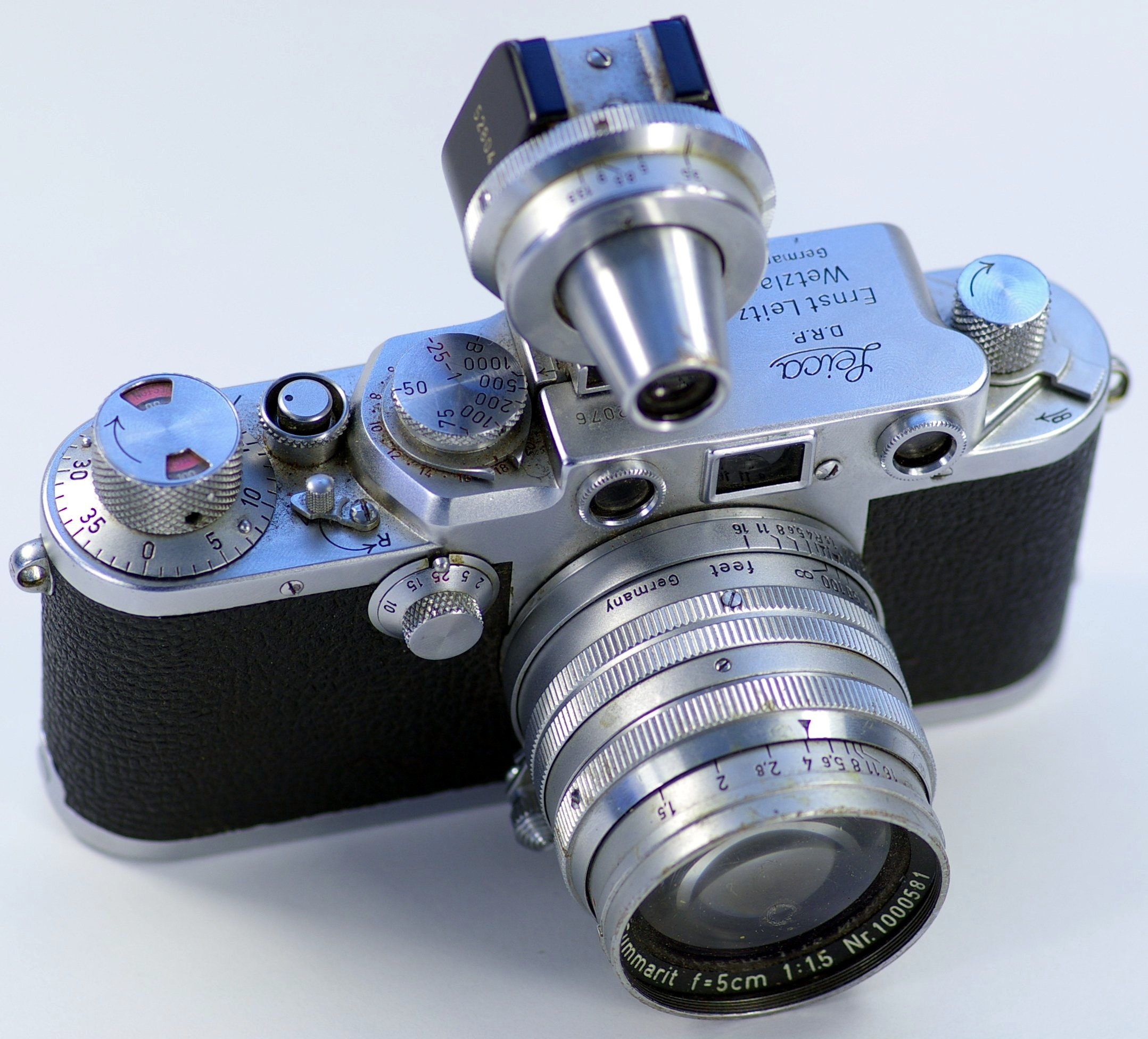
- Leica IIIf fitted with a Summarit 50mm f/1.5 and a viewfinder. This particular model does not feature a self-timer.

Overview
- Maker: Leica Camera
- Type: 35 mm rangefinder camera

Lens
- Lens mount: M39 lens mount

Focusing
- Focus: manual

Exposure/metering
- Exposure: manual

Flash
- Flash: cold shoe

The Leica III is a Barnack model rangefinder camera introduced by Leica in 1933 and produced in parallel with the Leica II series. Several models were produced over the years, with significant improvements.

The Leica III uses a coupled rangefinder distinct from the viewfinder. The viewfinder is set for a 50mm lens; use of shorter or longer lenses requires installing an alternate viewfinder on the accessory socket.

Leica III models
Model name	Manufacturing dates	Features or improvements	Image
Leica F (Leica III)	1933–1939	Like II but with slow speeds on front dial *	
Leica 250	1933–1946	Leica III or IIIa with 250-image magazines (10 metres of film)	
Leica G (Leica IIIa)	1935–1940	Top shutter speed of 1/1000 s	
Leica IIIb	1938–1940	Rangefinder and view windows closer together	
Leica IIIc	1940–1951	Die-cast body, slightly longer, redesigned shutter featuring ball bearings	
Leica IIId	1940–1945	Very rare, only 427 were built	
Leica IIIf	1950–1956	Introduced in time for Christmas 1950. Featured in-camera user selectable flash synchronization for the multitude of flash bulbs then available. Two versions produced, (1950–52) with non geometric shutter speeds and had black flash synchro numbers. Collectors refer to this model as a "Black Dial, aka BD". Second version (1953–56) switched to modern geometric speeds and was distinguished by red lettering on flash synchro numbers. Collectors refer to this model as a "Red Dial, aka RD". A self-timer was offered as a factory installed option in 1954. Many owners of the first IIIf version opted to send their cameras to Leica for self-timer retrofits. Collectors add the suffix ST (self timer) to the BD and RD nomenclature. BDST and RDST are used to identify models with self timers.	
Leica IIIg	1957–1960	Larger and brighter viewfinder, consequent change in body configuration to facilitate manufacture. Projected frame lines and automatic parallax correction for 50 and 90mm lenses. Rare.	

== Accessories and miscellaneous images ==
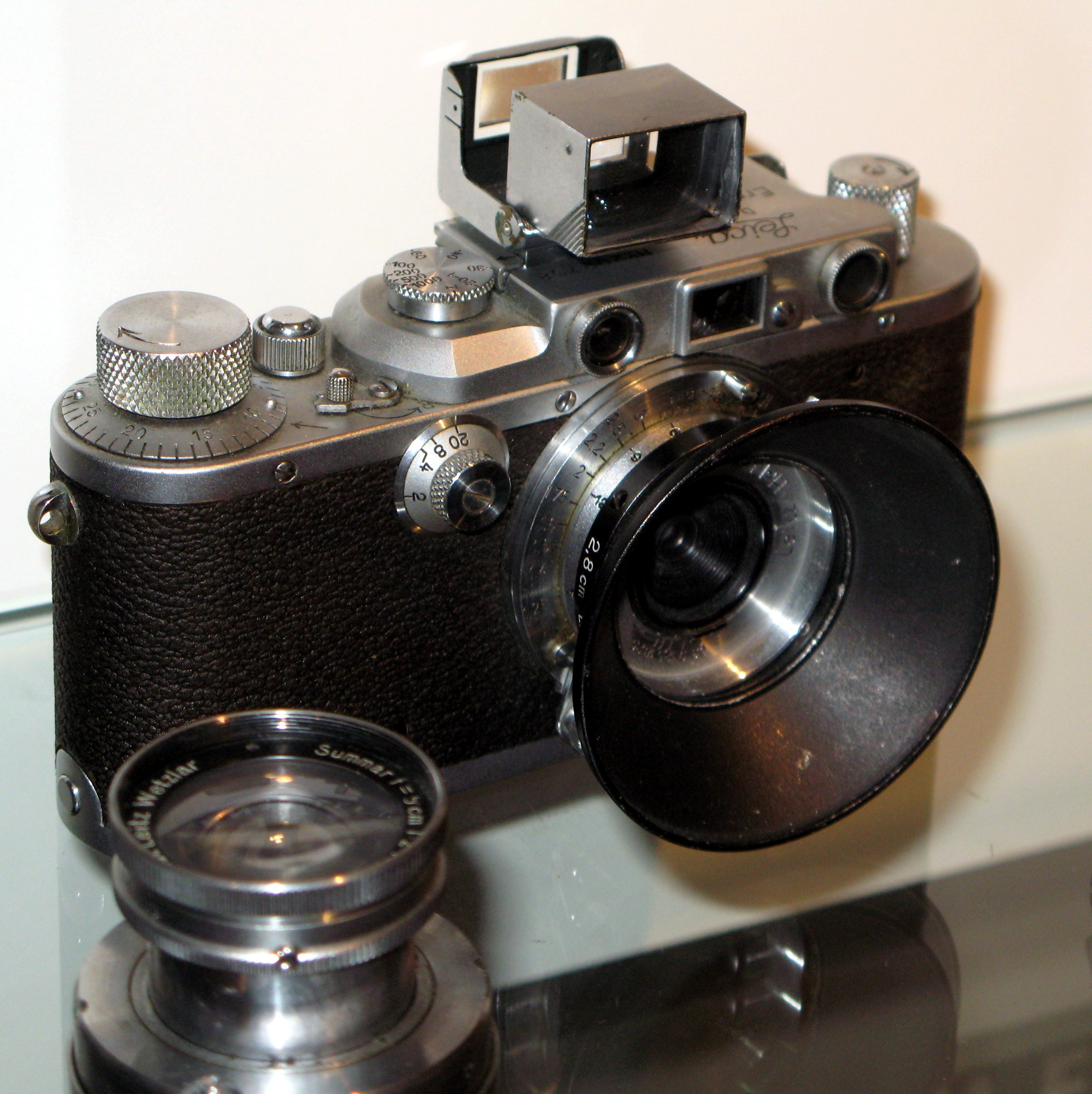
With a 28mm wide-angle lens and optional viewfinder

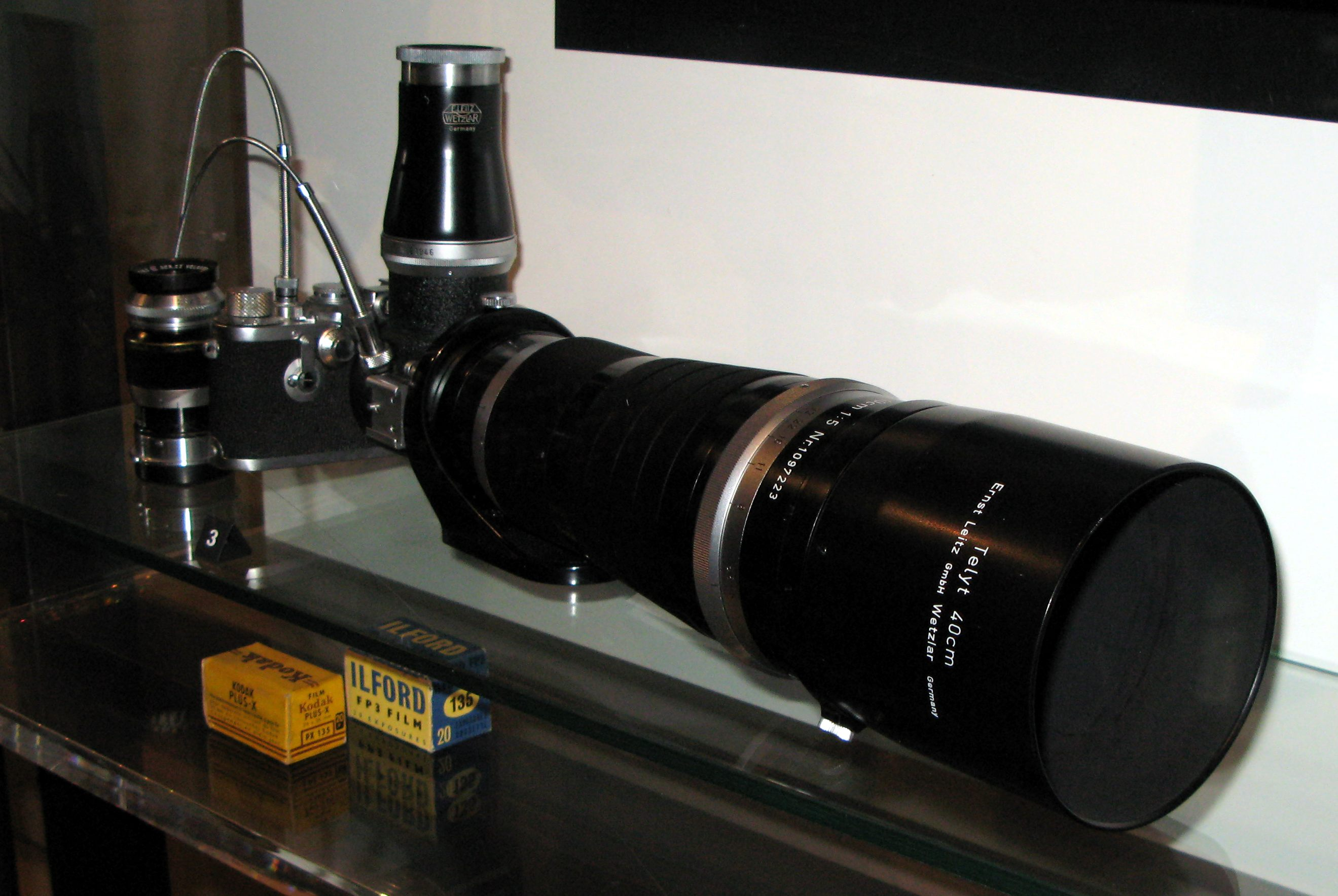
With a 400mm Telyt lens

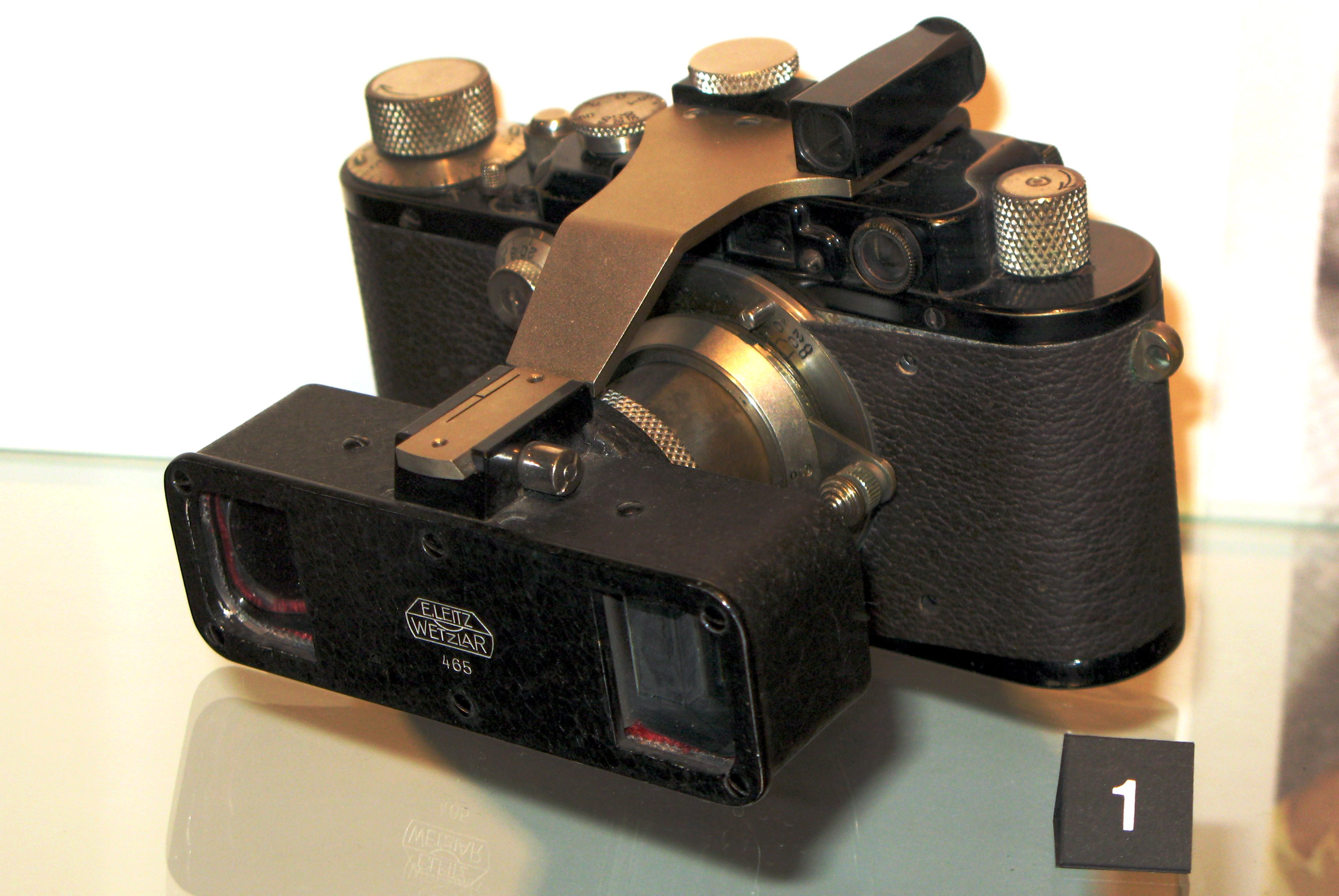
With an adapter for stereo-photography

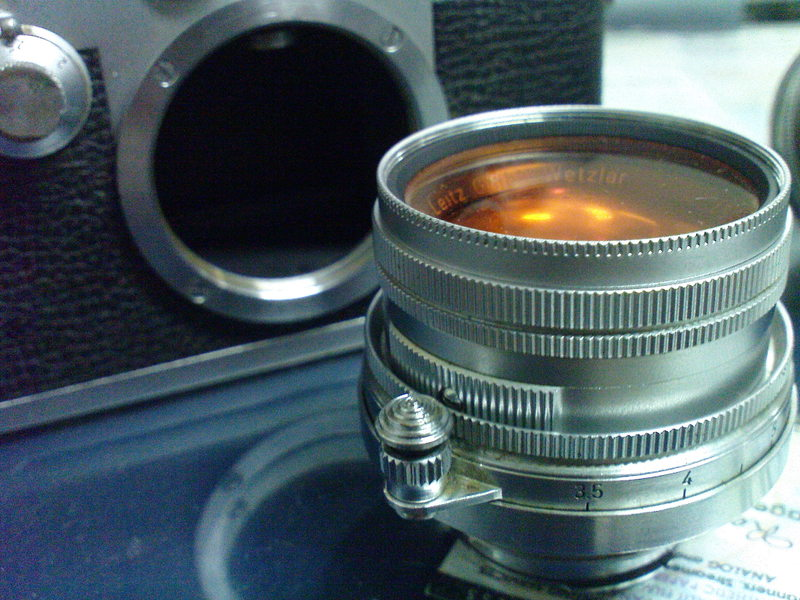
Orange filter for the Leica III

Orthographic views of a Leica IIIf with Summicron lens

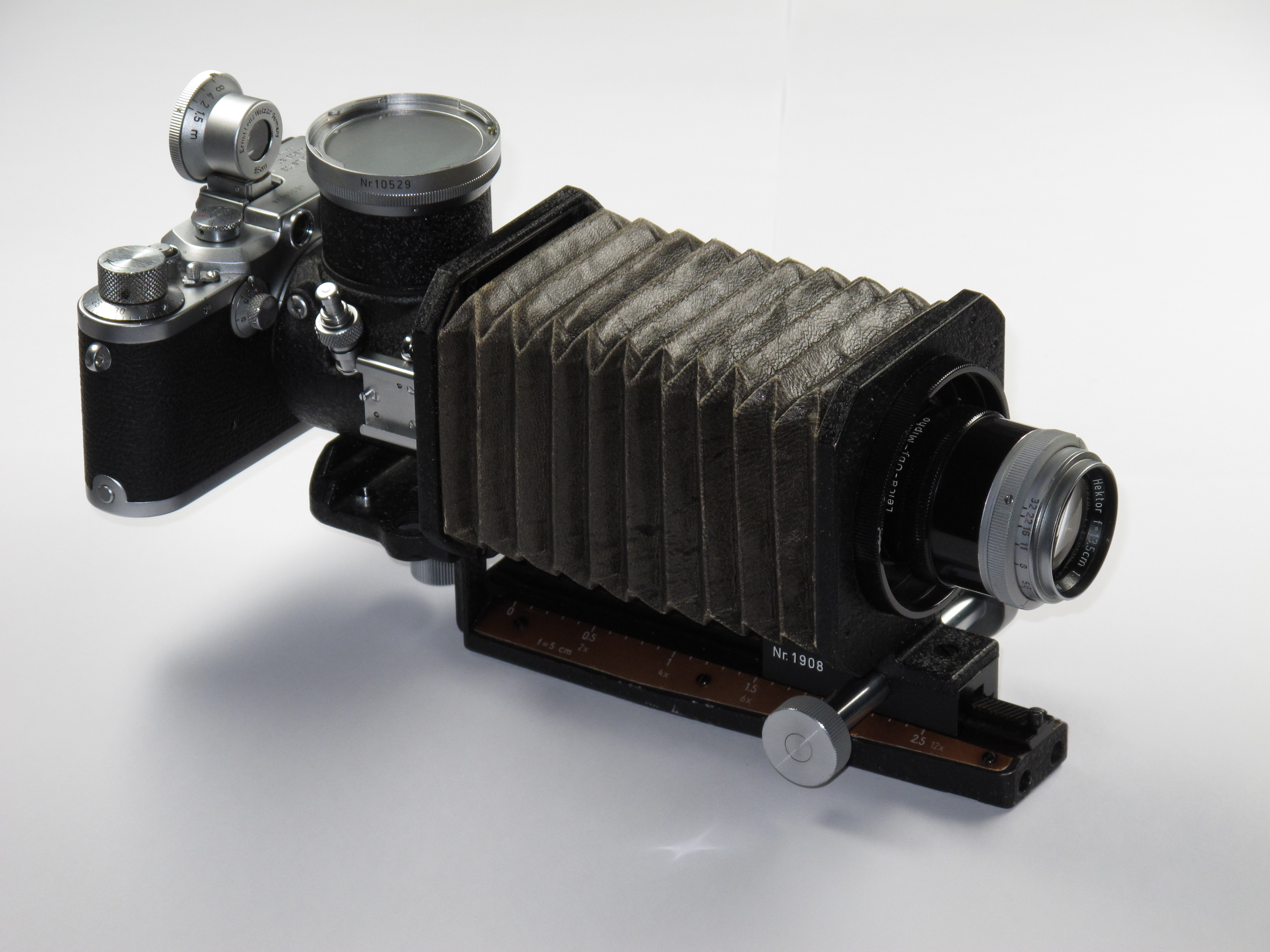
Leica IIIc with bellows
