= Olympus XA =

Japanese series of cameras

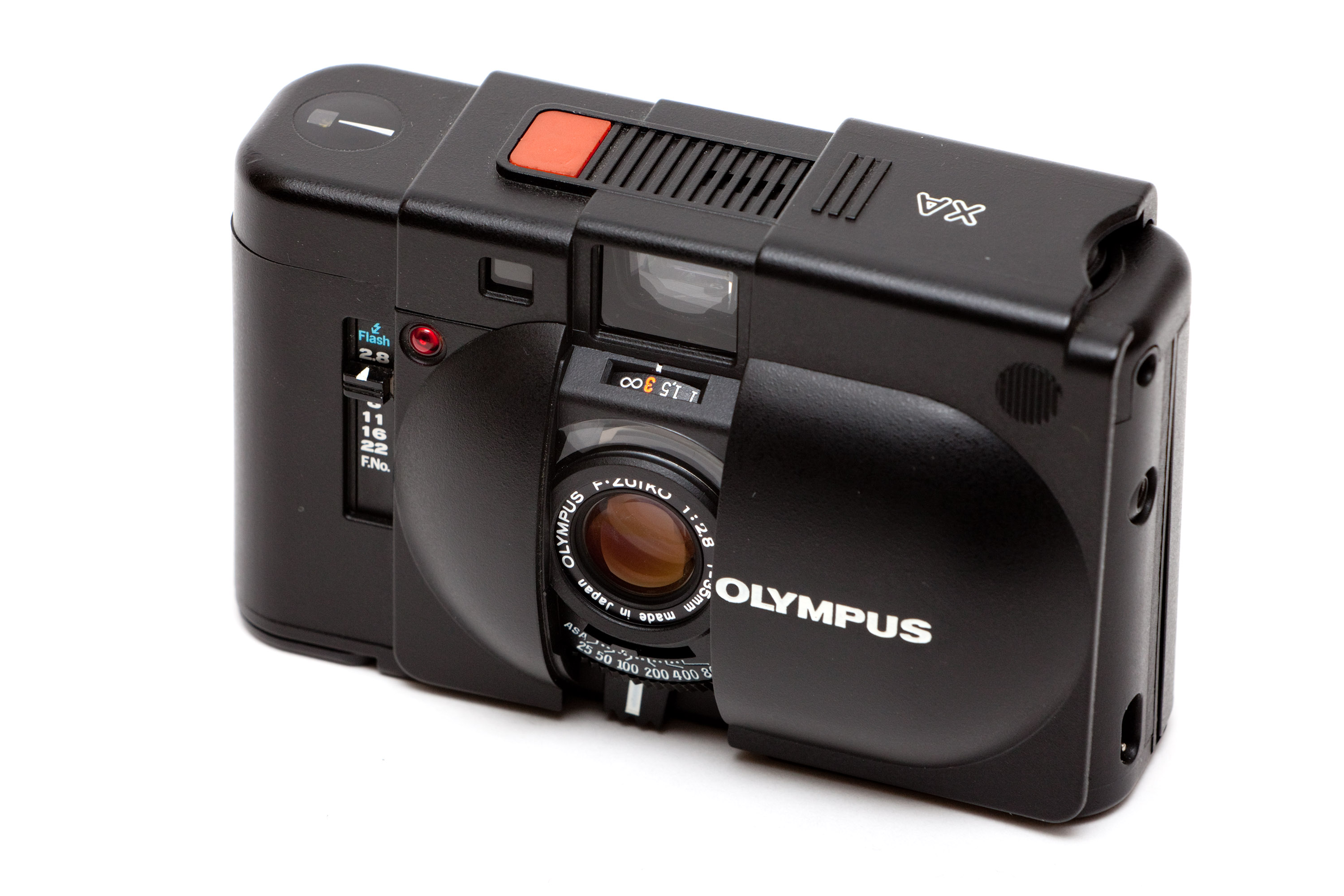
Olympus XA

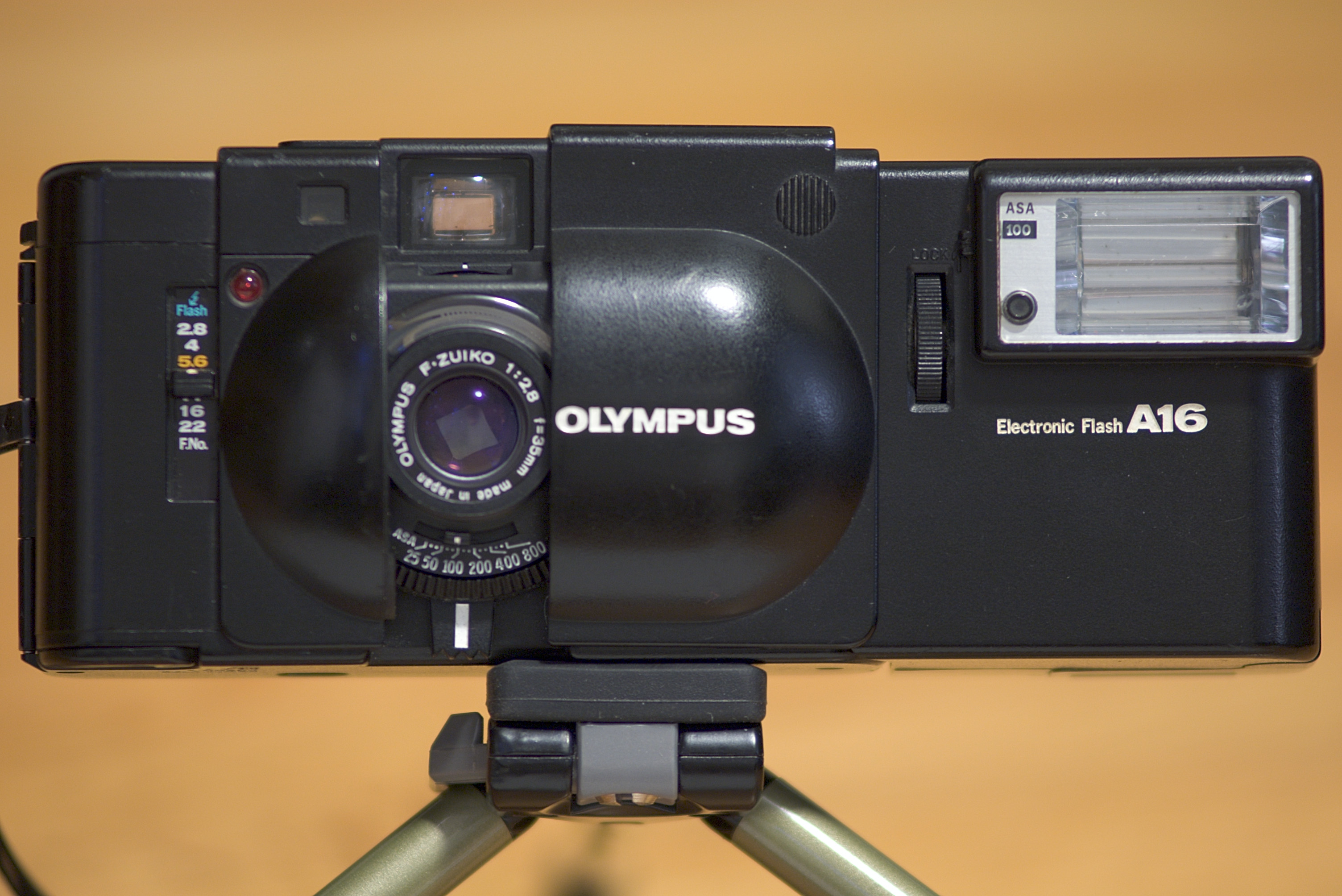
The XA with an attached A16 flash.

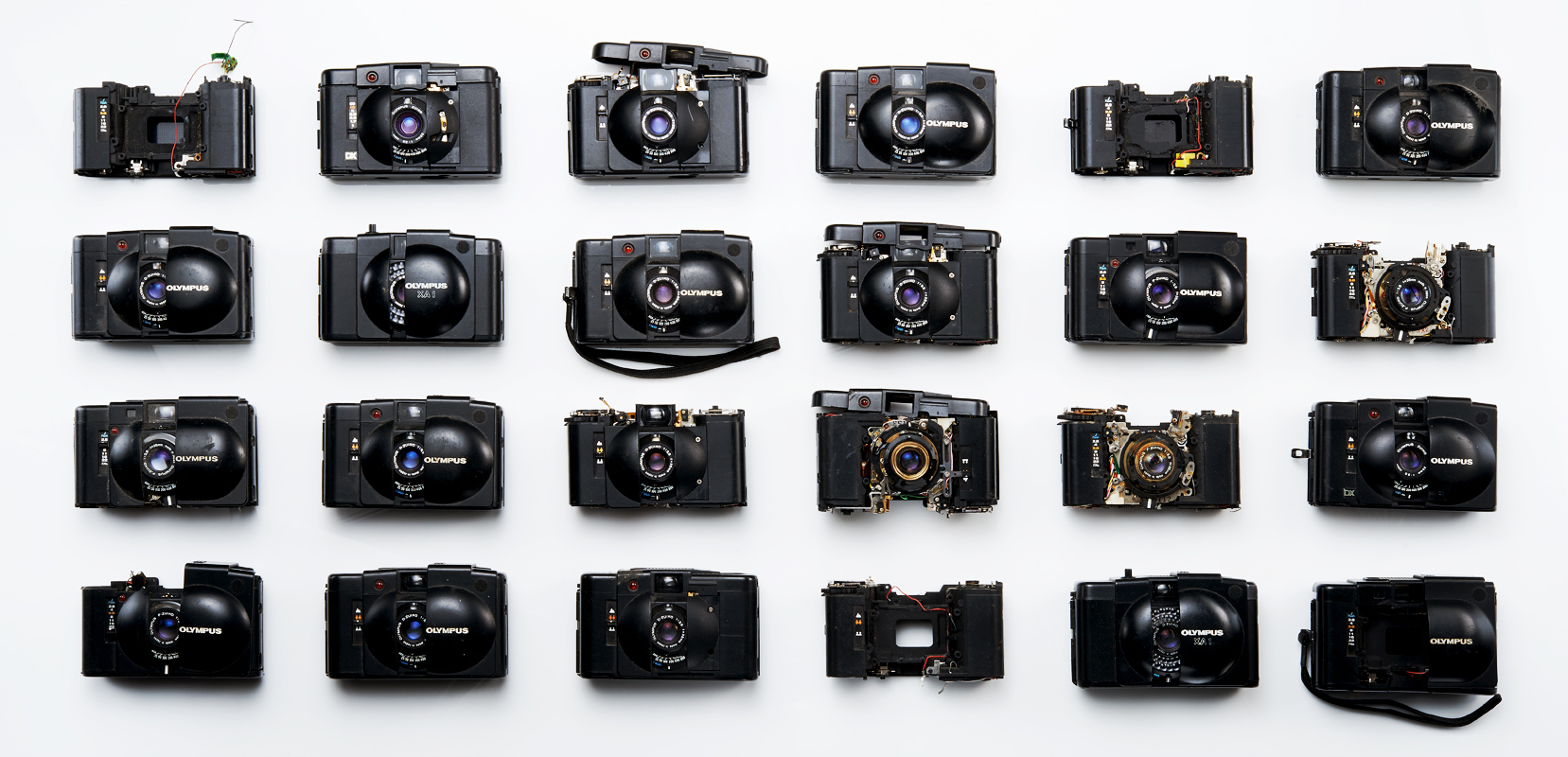
Olympus XA Cameras

The Olympus XA was a series of 35 mm cameras manufactured and marketed by Olympus of Japan from 1979 to 1985. The original XA was a rangefinder camera with a fast 35 mm f/2.8 lens, and aperture priority metering. It was one of the smallest rangefinder cameras ever made, together with the Contax T. Later models—XA2, XA3 and XA4—featured scale focusing instead of rangefinders. The lens design also changed, switching to a 35mm f/3.5 for the XA2 and XA3 and again to a 28mm f/3.5 for the XA4.

== History ==
It was designed by Yoshihisa Maitani who had joined Olympus Optical Co Ltd in 1956. He was the chief camera designer and managing director of Olympus Optical Co Ltd., having developed a number of legendary cameras during his career. These included the Pen series, the OM series, and the XA series. Before he retired, the company also released the IS series and the [mju:]/Stylus series of cameras, the designs of which were credited to others.

Maitani started with the concept of a full-frame camera that can be carried in a pocket every day, working on basic size and shape in a series of clay models. He set a target thickness of 4 cm (1.6 in) and approached the head of the Lens Division, Yoshisada Hayamizu, who previously had designed the Tessar-type D.Zuiko lens fitted to the original Pen. Hayamizu concluded that fitting a lens with a focal length of 35 mm was not possible in a camera body that thin, and told Maitani that a 31 mm lens would be required, which unfortunately would make it "unsuitable for taking shots of people". At that point, Maitani unveiled several of his prototype clay models, explaining that he already had discarded a thickness of 4 1/2 cm (1.8 in): "See how much the front protrudes. There's such a strong feeling of the lens poking out, the whole style is ruined. [...] if we can't make the four centimeter mark, well, this whole camera project will end up as a failure." The lens team began with a Tessar-style design, but by adopting what he later called a "reverse retrofocus" configuration, they designed a six-element, five-group lens with a focal length of 35 mm and, critically, a distance of 33.6 mm (1.32 in) from the front element to the film plane, enabling Maitani's 4 cm camera.

The original model, the XA, was sold from 1979 to 1985.

== Models ==
- Olympus XA: small rangefinder with aperture priority 35mm f/2.8 lens
- Olympus XA1: simple mechanical camera with a selenium meter
- Olympus XA2: scale focus camera, automatic shutter 35mm f/3.5 lens
- Olympus XA3: Same as XA2 with "DX" automatic film speed recognition
- Olympus XA4: distance focus camera, 28mm wide macro lens

The original XA's lens was protected by a sliding dust cover. Film wind is by thumb-wheel, aperture is set on the right side of the body using a small lever, focus is set by a small lever below the lens, film speed (ISO) is set on a dial below the lens, the viewfinder is optical direct-view with the rangefinder frame embedded in it and a display of the shutter speed at the side. There was also a small lever on the camera's base which when flipped out, added 1 1/2 stops exposure to the shutter speed. This could be used to counteract the effects of subject back lighting.

The XA1 used a fixed-focus lens. Although the cameras resembled each other, there were subtle differences in design. The XA3 and XA4 were slightly larger than the XA and XA2. The original XA's dust cover dome resembled a flattened oval, whereas the other models had a more rounded design. Each of these substituted focusing distance for the right-side lever for the aperture-control of the original XA. As a result these cameras were automatic program only, whereas the original XA was an aperture-priority camera.

== Accessories ==
The XA series was accompanied by a range of detachable flash units. The standard A11 took one AA battery and had a guide number of 10. The A16 took two batteries and had a guide number of 16. The A9M and A1L were smaller units for the XA1 and XA4 respectively.

== Specifications ==
Olympus XA series specifications
	XA	XA1	XA2	XA3	XA4
Image					
Lens	F.Zuiko f=35mm 6e/5g	D.Zuiko f=35mm 4e/4g			Zuiko f=28mm 5e/5g
Aperture	f/2.8–22	f/4–22	f/3.5–14		
Shutter	10s~1/500s, leaf	1/30s~1/250s	2s~1/750s, leaf		
Focusing	0.9 m (3.0 ft)–∞, rangefinder	1.5 m (4.9 ft)–∞, fixed	3-position zone/scale		0.3 m (0.98 ft)–∞, zone/scale
Exposure	aperture-priority auto with +1.5 backlight compensation	programmed auto		programmed auto with +1.5 backlight compensation	
ISO	25-800	100-400	25-800	25-1600	25-1600
Battery	2× SR44/EPX-76	none (selenium cell)	2× LR/SR44		
Size	102 mm × 64.5 mm × 40 mm 4.0 in × 2.5 in × 1.6 in	104 mm × 65 mm × 40 mm 4.1 in × 2.6 in × 1.6 in	102 mm × 65 mm × 40 mm 4.0 in × 2.6 in × 1.6 in		102 mm × 64.5 mm × 38.5 mm 4.0 in × 2.5 in × 1.5 in
Weight	225 g 7.9 oz	190 g 6.7 oz	200 g 7.1 oz	220 g 7.8 oz	230 g 8.1 oz
Years	1979–1985	1982-1985	1980-1985	1985	1985
