= Oskar Barnack =

German optical engineer

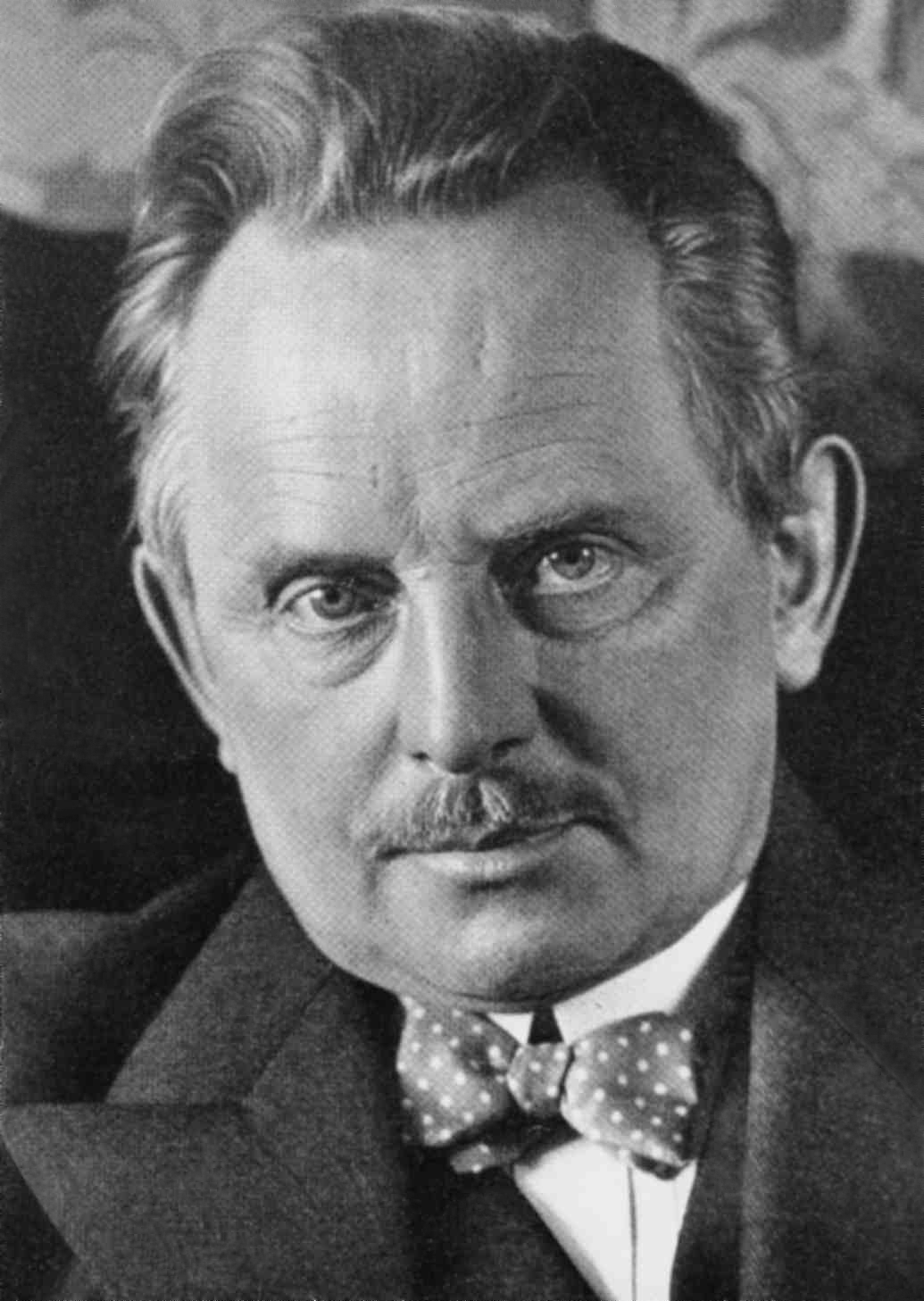
- Oskar Barnack
- Born: 1 November 1879; Lynow, Nuthe-Urstromtal, Kingdom of Prussia
- Died: 16 January 1936 (aged 56); Bad Nauheim, Germany
- Engineering career
- Projects: Camera

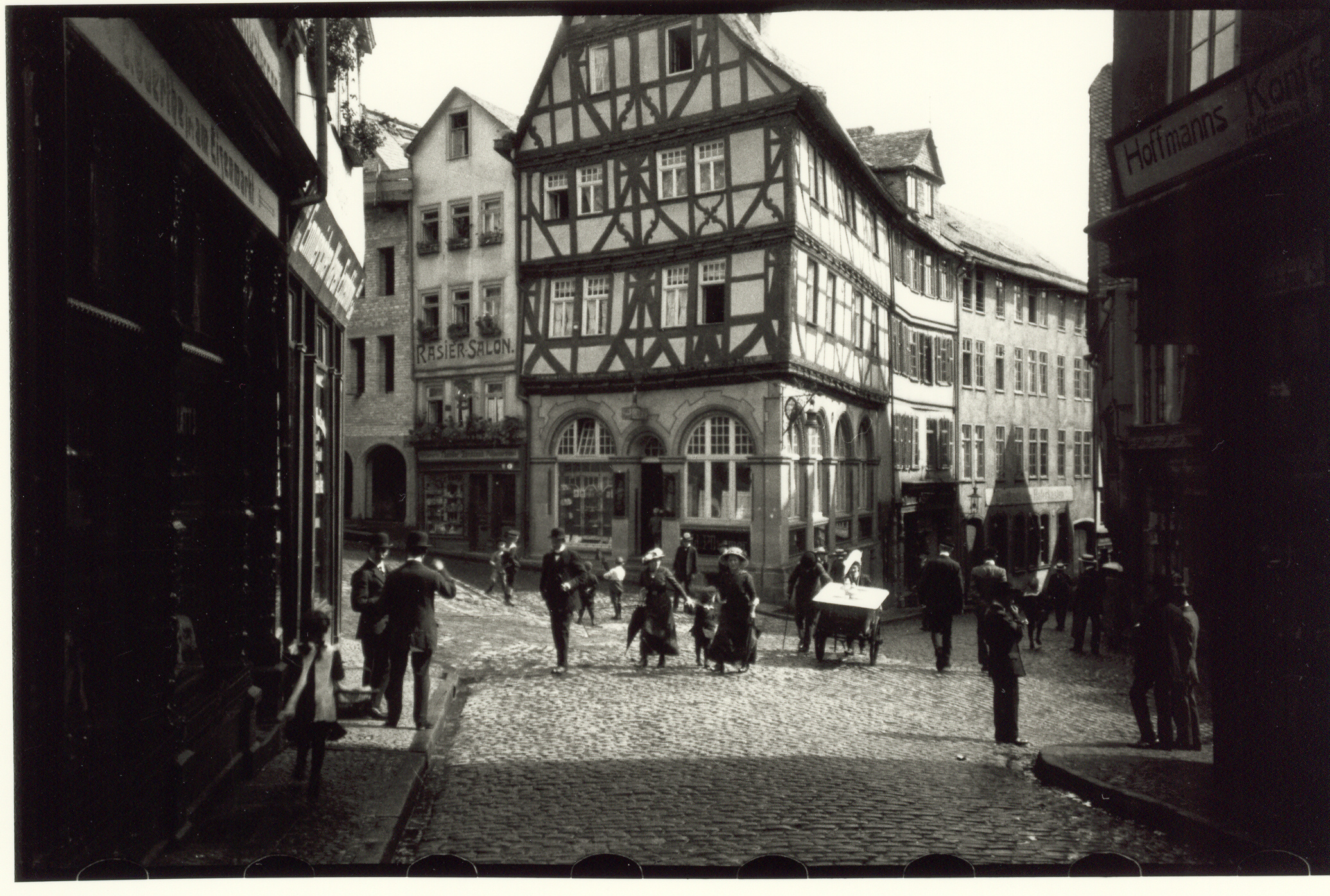
First image taken from the Ur-Leica by Oskar Barnack 1914, Eisenmarkt, Wetzlar, Germany

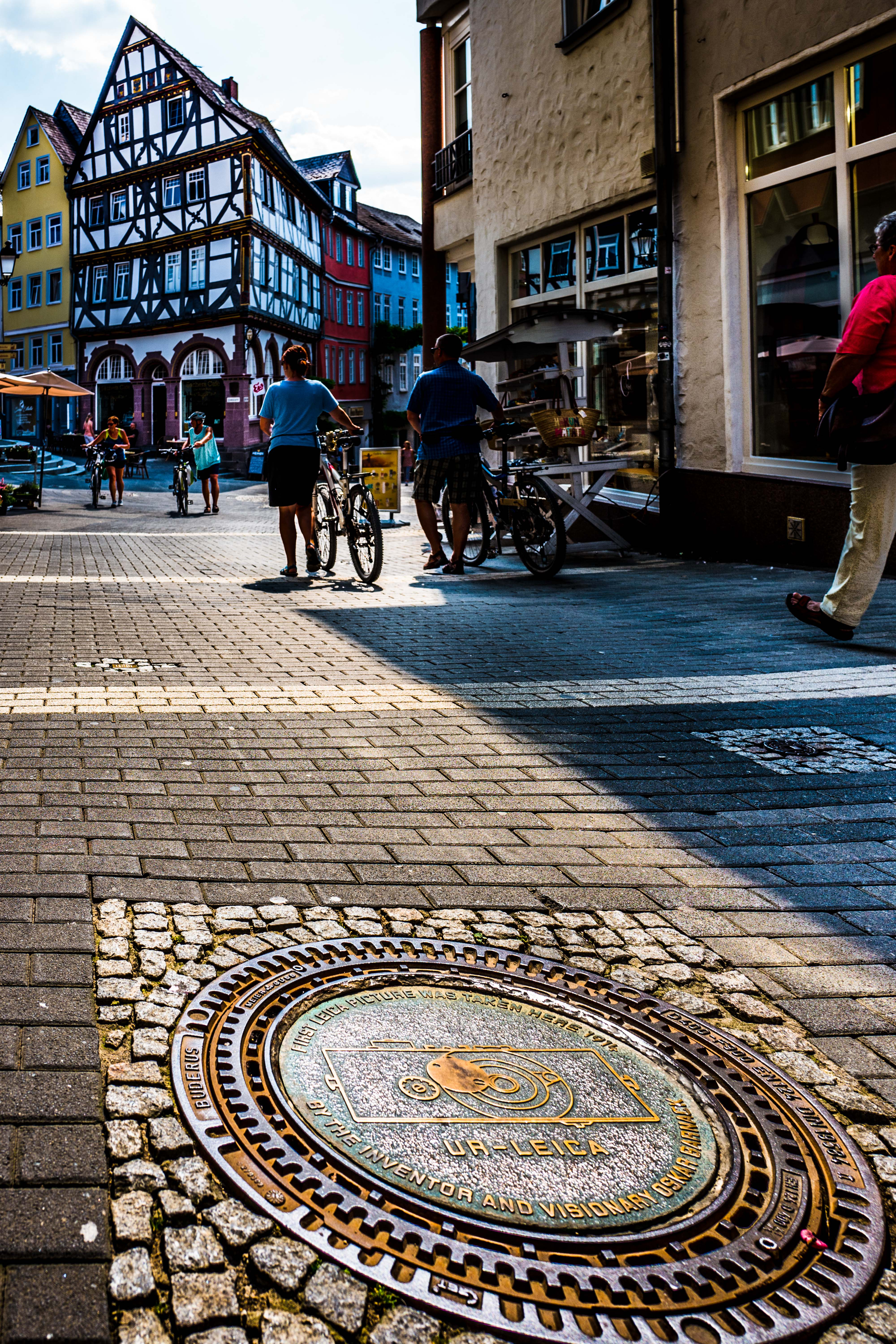
A commemorative plaque marks the spot in Wetzlar where Oskar Barnack tested his Ur-Leica in this modern view (2018).

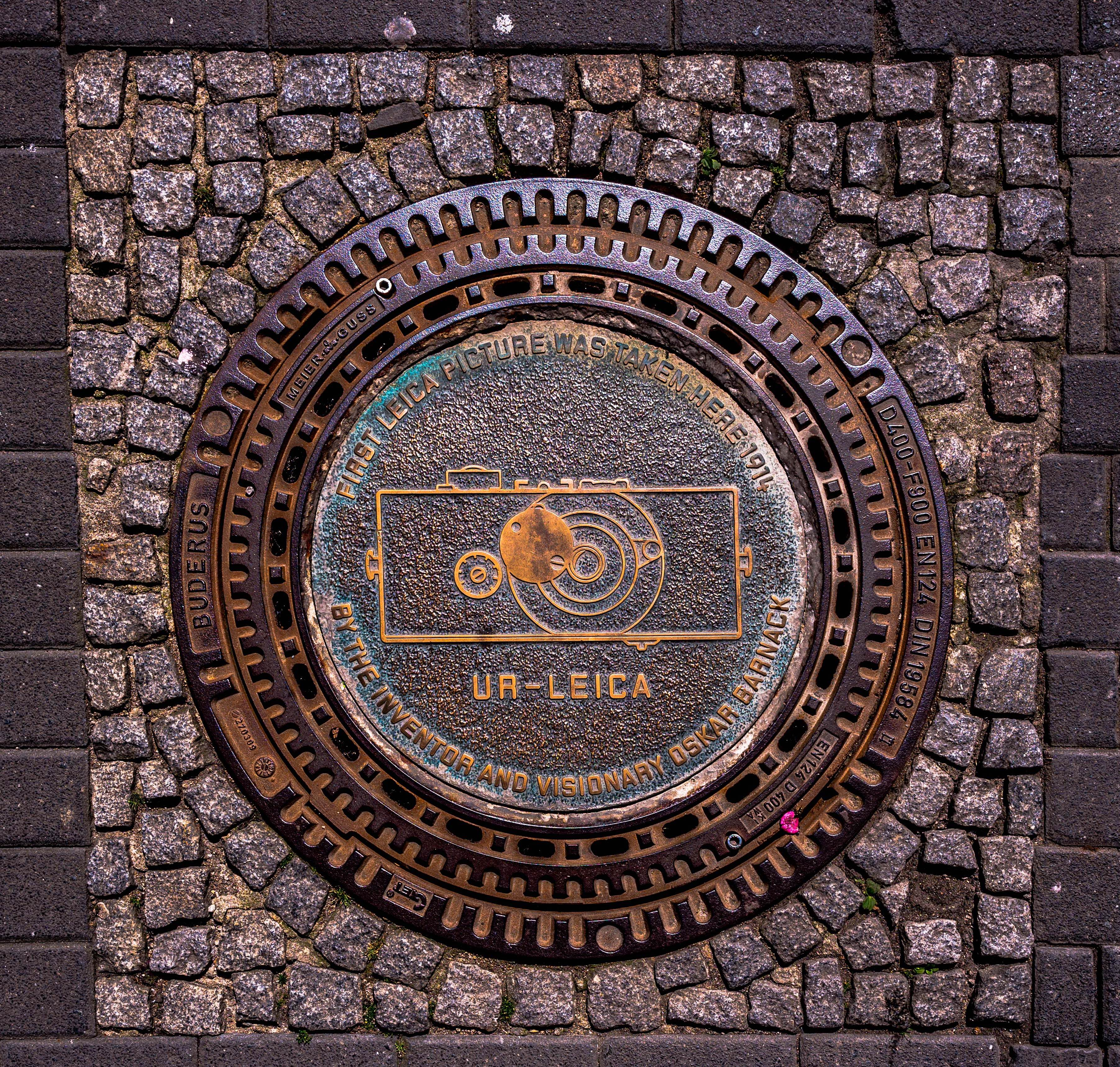
A commemorative plaque marks the place where Oskar Barnack first tested his Ur-Leica in Wetzlar.

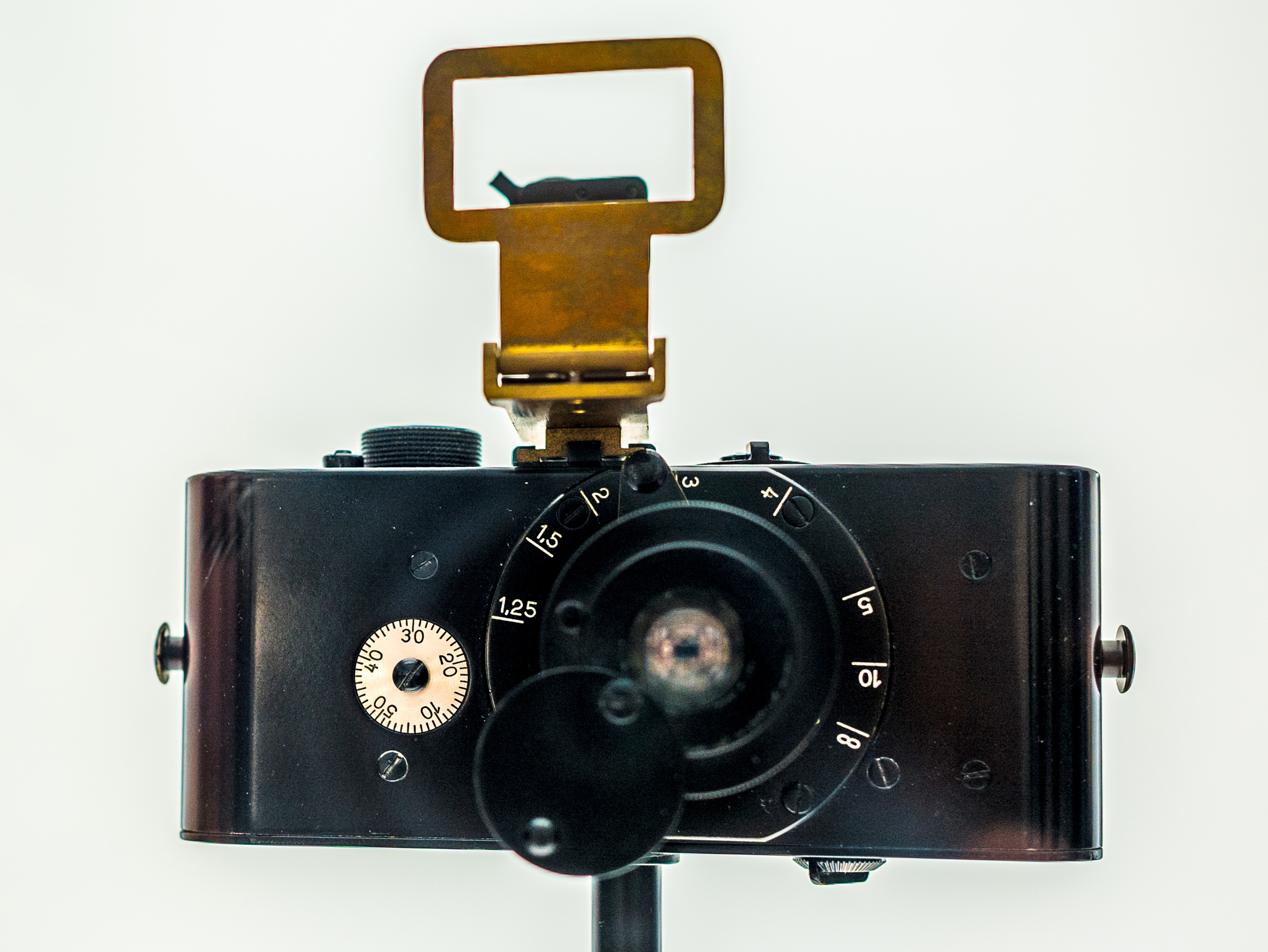
A replica of the first Leica camera, the Ur-Leica, developed by Oskar Barnack. This replica is on display at the company's headquarters in Wetzlar, Germany.

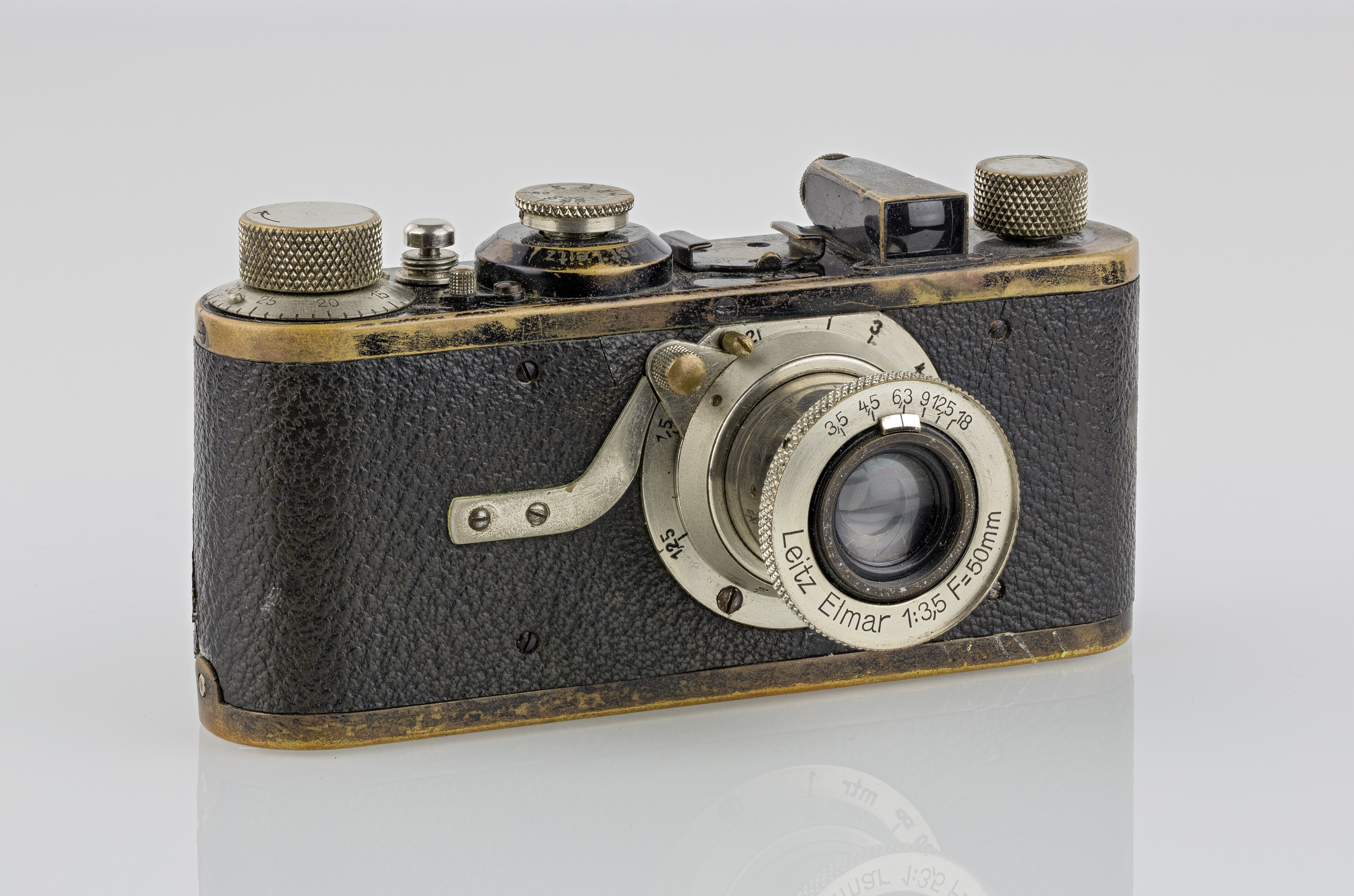
Leica I, 1927, invented by Oskar Barnack

Oskar Barnack (Nuthe-Urstromtal, Brandenburg, 1 November 1879 – Bad Nauheim, Hesse, 16 January 1936) was a German inventor and photographer who built, in 1913, what would later become the first commercially successful 35mm still-camera, subsequently called Ur-Leica at Ernst Leitz Optische Werke (the Leitz factory) in Wetzlar.

== Life and career ==
Barnack was an engineer at the Leitz company and suffered from asthma, so he proposed reducing the size and weight of cameras in order to be able to take photographs in his travels. In 1924 the camera was named Leica, an acronym obtained from Leitz Camera. It was released at the Leipzig Fair in 1925.

Between 1913 and 1914, Barnack adapted 35 mm cinematic film for still-camera use with a larger negative than other 35mm cameras. The pronged-film rollers holding the perforated film allowed more precision than typical paper-backed roll film. His design was revolutionary because he transported the film horizontally, allowing an extended frame size to 24×36 mm with a 2:3 aspect ratio, instead of the 18x24 mm of cameras that carried the film vertically. Negatives in this small format could be enlarged to obtain sharper positive images. For this to be effective, the camera also needed a high-quality lens capable of producing the larger format film's quality.

Barnack tried various types of lenses, trying to find the best quality images. At the time, lenses for existing 35mm cameras covered the 18×24 mm frame format, so the larger Leica frame size was only partially covered. Existing Leitz and competing Zeiss lenses were either too large for the camera or would not cover the 24x36 frame. To achieve the necessary resolution for a satisfactory enlargement, the 24x36 mm format needed a specially designed lens. Leica's first suitable lens was a 50 mm f/3.5 design based on the "Cooke triplet"; this would later evolve into the famous Leica Elmar series of lenses.

In 1923 Barnack convinced his boss, Ernst Leitz II, to make a series of 31 pre-production cameras for the factory and for outdoor photographers. Although the prototypes received a mixed reception, Ernst Leitz decided in 1924 to produce the camera. It was a success when presented at the Spring Fair of Leipzig in 1925 as the Leica I (Leitz camera).

Barnack was also one of the first photographers to create news images in which people's relationship to their surroundings could be seen. In this style, he made the first news image made with a 35 mm camera, showing the flood caused by the Lahn River in Wetzlar.

In 1979, on the occasion of the centenary of its birth, the Leica Oskar Barnack Award was awarded, endowed with 5000 euros, and awarded in July at the Meetings of Arles.

== Oskar Barnack Award ==
An international jury awards the Leica Oskar Barnack Award to professional photographers, whose powers of observation capture and express the relationship between man and the environment in the most graphic way in a sequence of a minimum of 10 to a maximum of 12 images.

Input presentations must be an autonomous series of images in which the photographer perceives and documents the interaction between man and the environment with an acute vision and contemporary visual style: creative, breakthrough and innovative. Only one entry per photographer is accepted. In addition to these categories of the Leica Oskar Barnack Award and the Leica Oskar Barnack Award Newcomer Prize, ten finalists will be awarded with a cash prize of 2,500 euros for their series.

The winner of the main category of the Leica Oskar Barnack Award receives a cash prize of 25,000 euros as well as a Leica M camera and a loan worth 10,000 euros.

== Collections ==
- International Photography Hall of Fame – St. Louis, MO
