= OM4 =

OM4 may refer to:

- Olympus OM-4, a camera
- OM4, a type of multi-mode optical fiber
