= OM2 =

OM2 may refer to:

- Olympus OM-2, a camera
- OM2, a type of multi-mode optical fiber
