= OM1 =

OM1 may refer to:

- Olympus OM-1, a camera
- OM1, a type of multi-mode optical fiber
