= Olympus OM system =

Line of 35mm SLR cameras, lenses, and accessories

The Olympus OM System was a line of 35mm single-lens reflex cameras, lenses and accessories sold by Olympus Corporation between 1972 and 2002. The range was designed by Yoshihisa Maitani, chief designer for Olympus, and his staff; OM stands for Olympus Maitani.

The nucleus of the system was a series of compact bodies divided into an advanced series and a later consumer-oriented series. The first model was the all-mechanical M-1 which, after pressure from Leica (which already had an M1 model), was renamed OM-1. At the same time the M system was renamed OM System. The camera included a full-aperture TTL Cadmium-sulphide (CdS) exposure meter, and a bayonet lens mount of relatively large diameter. By the end of the 1970s it was joined by the semi-automatic OM-2 and consumer-oriented OM-10. Olympus continued the naming pattern with the 'professional' OM-3 and OM-4, and the consumer-level OM-20, OM-30 and OM-40. The cameras were accompanied by a series of Zuiko-branded lenses, as well as a generous selection of accessories. The majority of OM bodies and lenses were manual-focus only; the OM-707 of 1986 was the only true autofocus model.

== Camera models ==
Olympus produced a wide variety of OM camera models over the years. These were divided into two distinct series. Cameras with single-digit model numbers were the 'professional' series, optimized for more advanced features and durability. Two-digit (or more) model numbers, or letters, meant a 'consumer' camera designed for ease of use.

All the consumer-grade models were discontinued after 1992, since the market for manual-focus SLR cameras had declined greatly in favour of autofocus SLRs. The consumer line returned in 1997 with the Cosina-sourced OM-2000 model. Professional and advanced-amateur demand for the high-end models continued, and they were produced until 2002, along with the consumer-grade OM-2000.

Chronology of OM-system cameras
Model	1970s										1980s										1990s										2000s									
Model	0	1	2	3	4	5	6	7	8	9	0	1	2	3	4	5	6	7	8	9	0	1	2	3	4	5	6	7	8	9	0	1	2	3	4	5	6	7	8	9
M-1																																								
OM-1																																								
OM-1 MD																																								
OM-1N																																								
OM-2																																								
OM-2N																																								
OM-2S/SP																																								
OM-3																																								
OM-3Ti																																								
OM-4																																								
OM-4T/Ti chrome																																								
OM-4T/Ti black																																								
OM-10																																								
OM-10 Quartz																																								
OM-20 (OM-G)																																								
OM-30(OM-F)																																								
OM-40 (OM-PC)																																								
OM-77AF (OM-707)																																								
OM-88 (OM-101)																																								
OM-2000																																								

=== Professional cameras ===
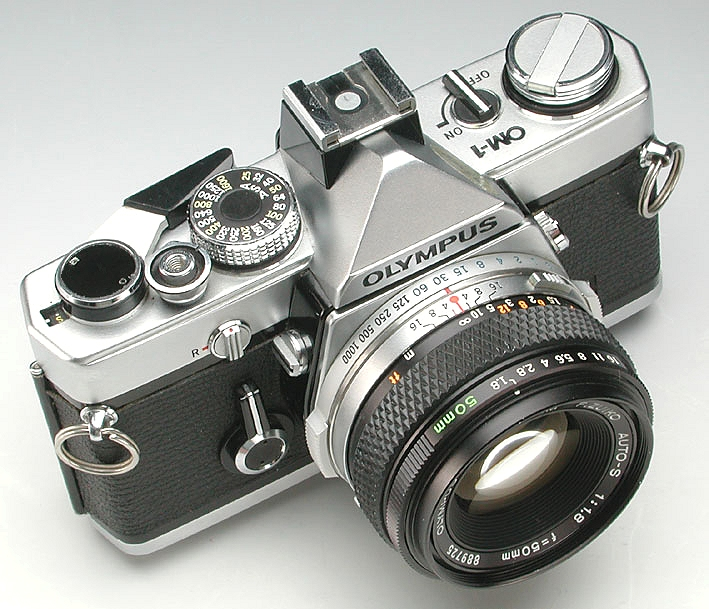
Olympus OM-1 MD

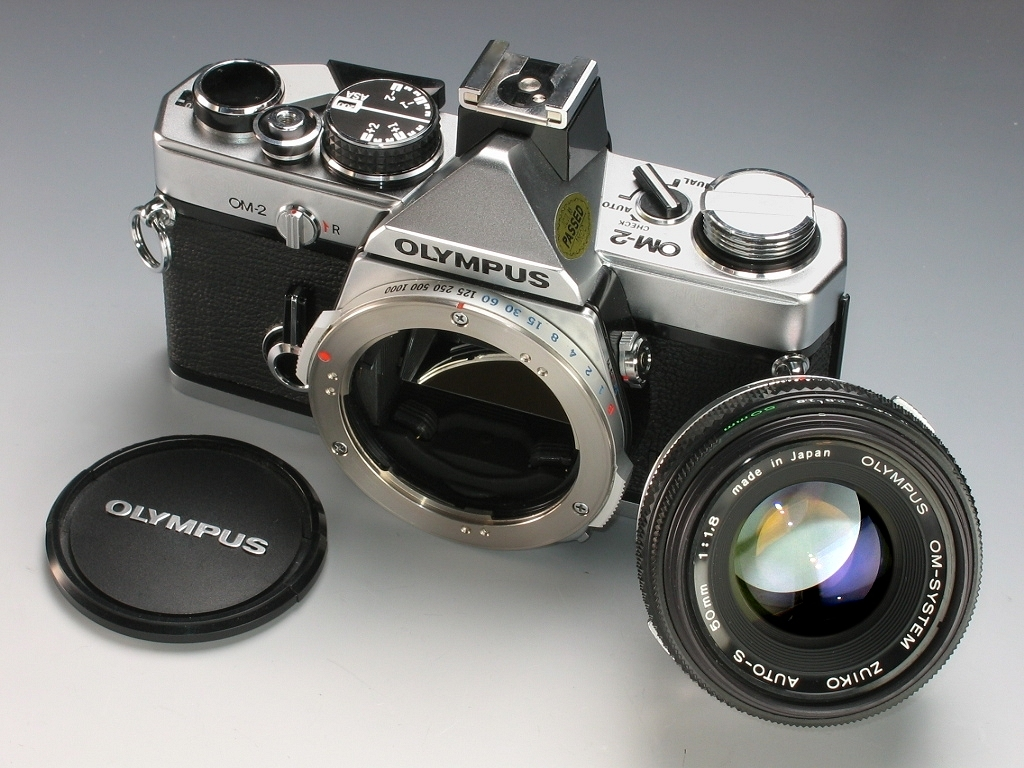
Olympus OM-2

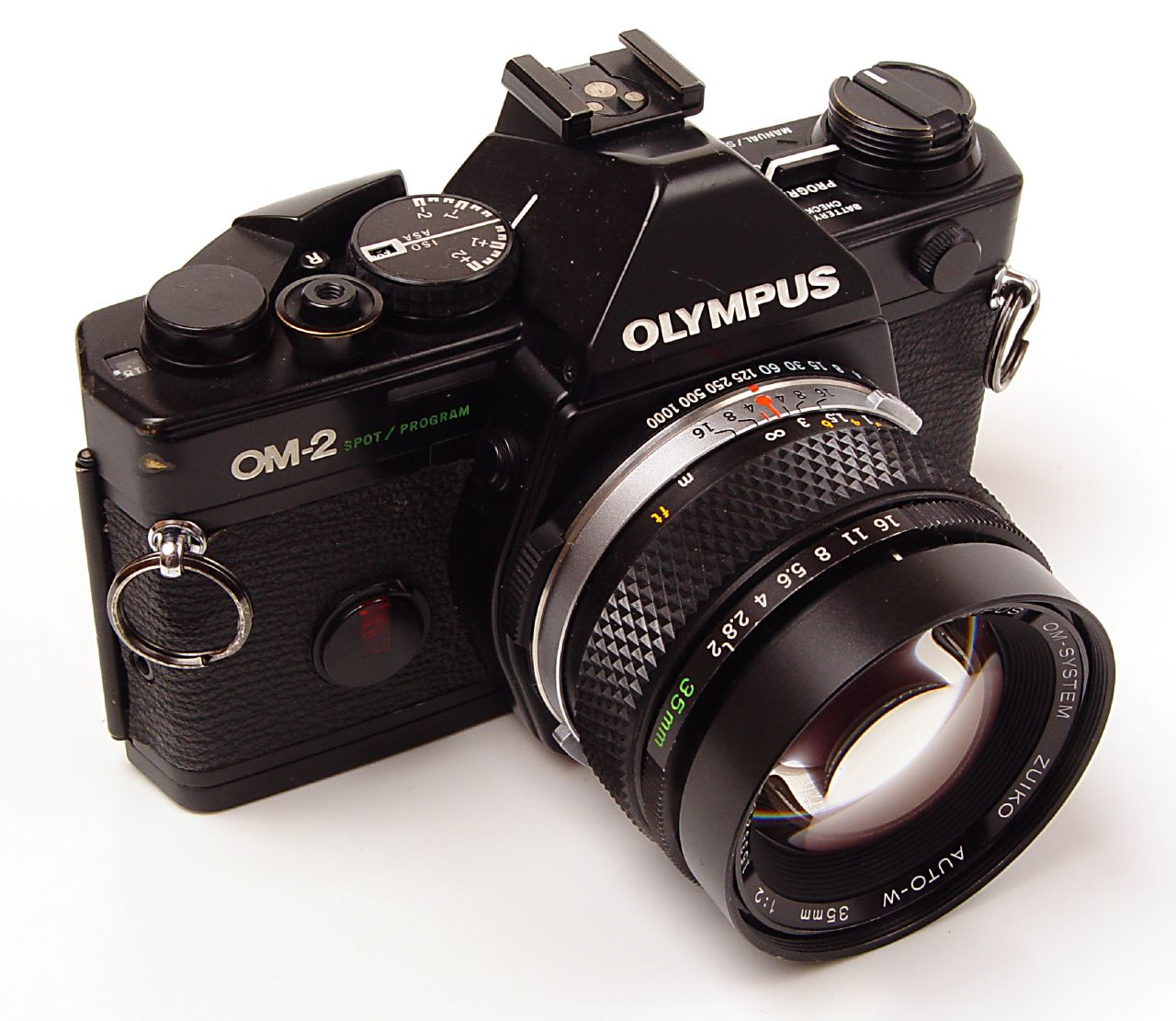
Olympus OM-2 SP

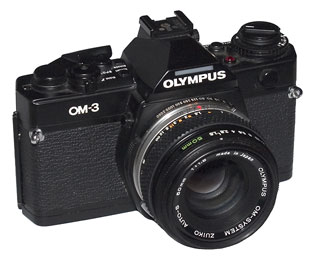
Olympus OM-3

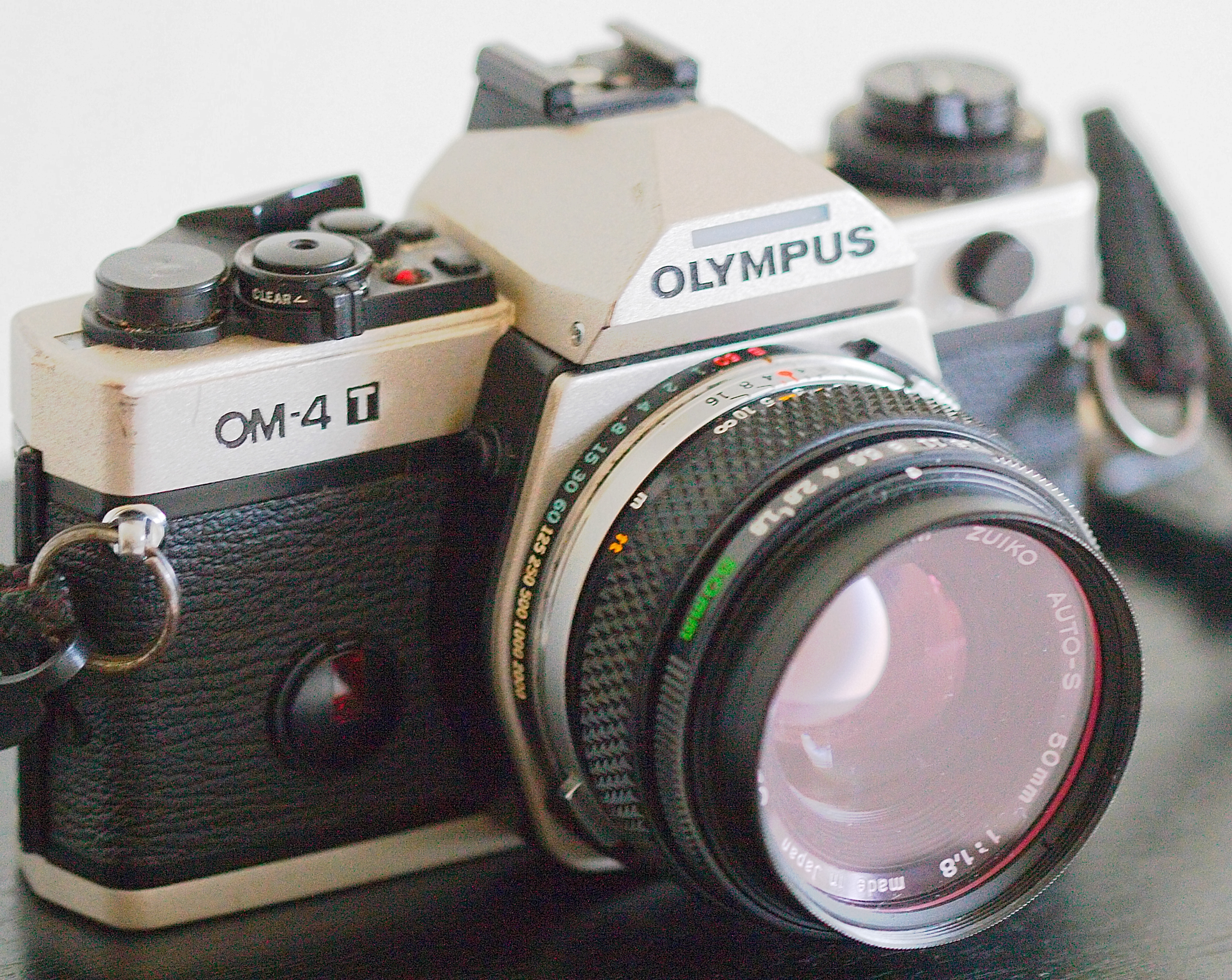
Olympus OM-4T

==== OM-1 ====
The Olympus OM-1 was a manually operated 35 mm single-lens reflex camera forming the basis of the OM system in 1972. At first called the Olympus M-1, Leica disputed this designation and it was changed to OM-1. It was designed by a team led by Yoshihisa Maitani with a through-the-lens exposure meter controlling a needle visible in the viewfinder. It was noted for its reduction of size, weight and noise. One feature unique to the OM-1, compared to the rest of the OM system, was its mirror lock-up facility which made it ideal for astrophotography and macrophotography.

==== OM-2 ====
Introduced in 1975, the Olympus OM-2 was a semi-automatic, aperture-priority camera featuring an electronically controlled shutter. It was based on the OM-1 body, and retained compatibility with OM-1 accessories and lenses. It boasted automatic through-the-lens (TTL) off-the-film (OTF) metering, and exposure was considered very accurate. This was calculated by the measured light reflected off the surface of the shutter, and/or the film surface during the actual exposure. The camera also offered a manual-exposure mode, as in the OM-1. It also introduced the integration of electronic flash into the exposure system using the TTL exposure system.

==== OM-3 ====
The OM-3 was an updated version of the OM-1, a manual camera without automatic exposure modes, and an entirely mechanical shutter. It featured a multi-spot metering system (shared with the OM-4) in addition to the centre-weighted metering of the earlier body. It also featured an LCD similar to the OM-4 which could be illuminated in low light. Its main advantage over the OM-4 was its ability to operate without batteries due to its mechanical design. Batteries were only needed for the exposure meter and LCD. It lacked a self-timer and mirror lock-up functions, however.

In 1995, nine years after the OM-3 was discontinued, the OM-3Ti was released. It shared the improvements over the OM-3 that the OM-4Ti held over the OM-4.

==== OM-4 ====
The Olympus OM-4, an improved version of the OM-2, was manufactured from 1983 to 1987. It was introduced at a US$685 list price for the body alone. It was a battery-powered, electromechanically controlled, manual focus SLR with manual exposure control or aperture priority autoexposure. It used a horizontal cloth focal plane shutter with a speed range of 240s (in auto mode) to 1/2000s plus bulb, and flash X-sync of 1/60s.

The OM-4 featured a built-in spot meter [of a narrow acceptance angle, see Canon FTb] (2% of view; 3.3˚ with 50 mm lens) and was the first camera capable of measuring eight individual areas and averaging them. The light meter used a dual-concentric segmented silicon photo-diode to provide spot or centerweighted readings. It used a graduated linear LCD for the shutter speed at the bottom of the viewfinder to precisely indicate its readings versus the actual camera settings.

In 1986 the OM-4 was improved to a tougher OM-4Ti (OM-4T in USA) version, with titanium top and bottom plates, improved weatherproofing and high-speed flash sync. This last version was discontinued in 2002.

=== Consumer-grade cameras ===
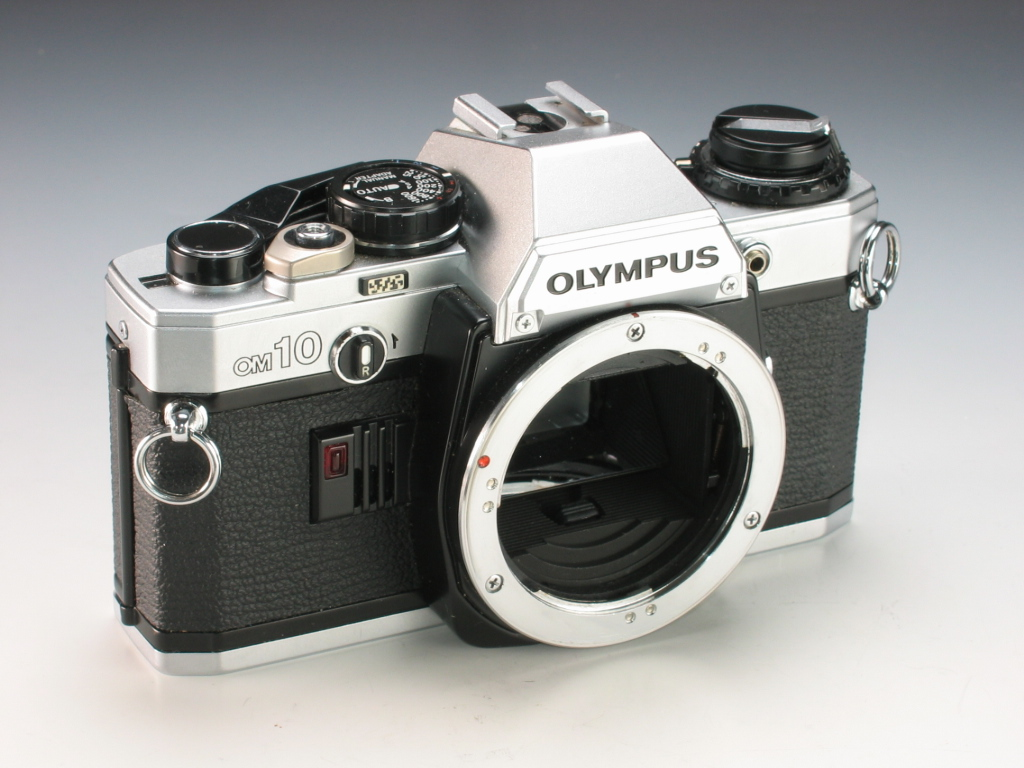
Olympus OM-10

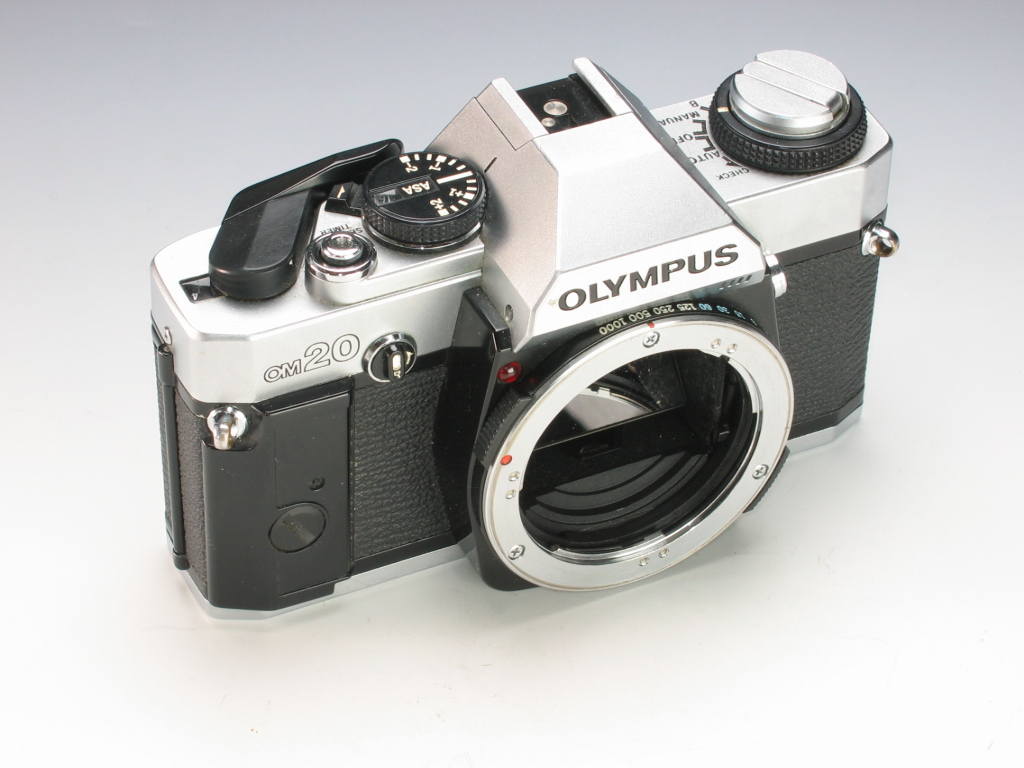
Olympus OM-20

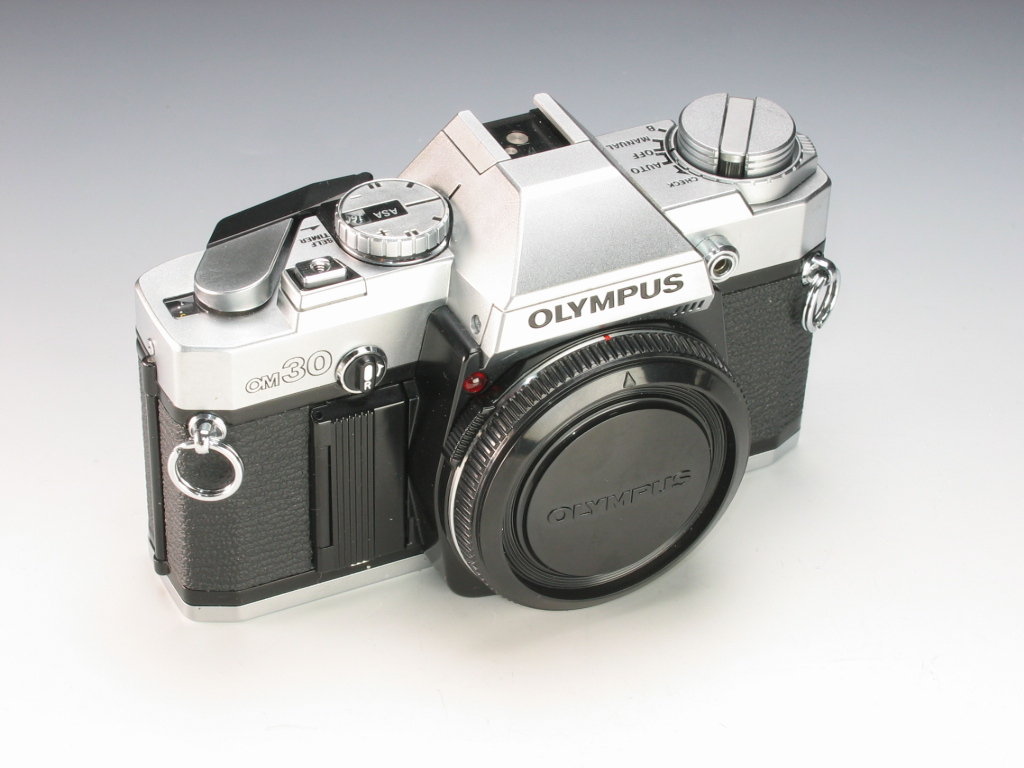
Olympus OM-30

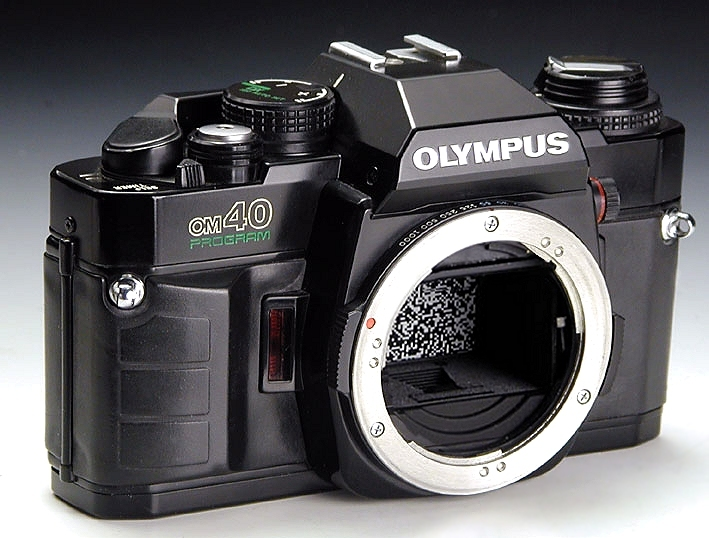
Olympus OM-40

==== OM-10 ====
The OM-10 hit the markets in June 1979 at the same time as the OM-2N. The camera was a 35mm focal-plane shutter aperture priority AE SLR camera with an electronic shutter. Only aperture-priority AE was available with the camera unless the optional manual exposure adapter was installed. This allowed the setting of shutter speeds between 1s and 1/1000s, (bulb mode was also available). The camera was equipped with a fixed pentaprism viewfinder which contained an LED exposure indicator. The finder coverage was measured to be 93%. A mirror-lockup facility was integrated into the self-timer function.

Exposure control was aperture priority AE using center-weighted light metering. Film speeds of the camera range from ASA 25 to ASA 1600. Film winding was done by using the film-wind lever located on the top right of the camera. Film rewinding was done manually using the film-rewind crank located at the top left. The camera body measured 136 × 83 × 50 mm and weighed approximately 430 grams (15 oz).

==== OM-20 ====
The OM-20 (sold in the United States as the OM-G) was essentially a refinement of the OM-10, replacing that model's rather tricky mode switch with one that was easier to use. The OM-20 also had a built-in shutter-speed dial, a mode display in the view finder and a much stronger winding mechanism which permitted it to be used at 5 frames per second on the OM Motor Drive 2. As with the OM10 before it, a mirror-lockup facility was integrated into the self-timer function. The shutter magnet and release system had other minor design improvements.

==== OM-30 ====
Essentially an OM-20 with auto-focus capability. With a normal lens there were lights in the view finder to help the user with manual focusing. Again as with the OM10 and OM20, a mirror-lockup facility was integrated into the self-timer function.

When used with a motor drive or winder unit and the M-In Focus Trigger cord, the lens could be pre-focused on a specific point. As soon as an object moved into that focus zone the camera would trigger a shot.

A special motorised 35-70mm autofocus lens was also available at the time, but is now very rare.

==== OM-40 ====
A further refinement of the OM-20 with features that were more of interest to serious photographers. It had a lighter, slightly more modern and ergonomic body design. It also had an early form of matrix metering, and a mirror lock-up facility. This was activated when the self-timer was switched on, a feature still rarely found in non-high-end cameras.

Also known in some markets as the OM-PC, the OM-40 had a program mode that automated the selection of both the aperture and the shutter speed.

==== OM-707 ====
Also known as the OM-77, the OM-707 is the first and only OM system autofocus camera. It requires DX films of 25 through 3200 ISO and is powered by four AAA batteries, which are not inserted directly into the camera but rather in an interchangeable Power Grip.

When used with the newly introduced range of autofocus lenses, the camera operates in programmed auto-exposure mode only, although the program can be shifted. Lenses without electronics operate in aperture priority mode, however the calculated shutter speed and in-focus indicator are not displayed. No form of exposure compensation is provided.

As OM AF lenses cannot be focused by hand, the single-point auto focus can be disabled in favor of unassisted Power Focus, in which the program shift slider controls the focus motor.

It supports a range of dedicated flashes: the premium F280 which supports Super FP sync, the ordinary T-series models, and the pop-up Power Flash Grip 300 which replaces the plain hand grip.

==== OM-101 ====
A low-cost version of the OM-707 without autofocus capability, marketed as OM-88 on the American market.

To enable more precise manual focusing, it features a split-image with microprism ring focusing screen instead of the OM-707's plain one. The aperture and speed displays have been reduced to an above/below 1/30 s indication, the X-sync speed reduced from 1/100 to 1/80 s. The shiftable program, high speed sync, continuous frame advance, and interchangeable grips have been removed; the exposure lock button has been replaced with a +1.5 EV exposure-boosting "backlight" button.

The camera is primarily designed for OM-707-designated autofocus and OM-101-exclusive Power Focus lenses, both of which are focused by rotating the prominent Power Focus dial on the back of the camera replacing the OM-707's less precise slider. With these, the camera operates in programmed exposure mode; the optional Manual Adapter 2, providing shutter and aperture dials, is required to access aperture-priority and manual modes. Non-native lenses can be used in aperture-priority mode (adjusted on the lens), with the Manual Adapter 2 adding manual mode.

A further cut down variant of the OM-101 lacking support for electronically controlled lenses (and, therefore, the Power Focus subsystem and Program mode) was released as the Olympus SC 35, a Scientific Camera intended for use with e.g. microscope and endoscope adapters. The SC 35 was bundled with a modified Manual Adapter relabeling the aperture knob with exposure compensation, and was manufactured in a variety of "Types" featuring different focusing screens.

=== OM-2000 ===
An Olympus model made by Cosina, the OM-2000 was not considered by Olympus 'die-hard fans' to be a 'true OM' camera.

The OM-2000 had a mechanical, vertical-running shutter in contrast to the traditional OM cameras with their horizontal-running shutter. This allowed the OM-2000 to synchronize an electronic flash at 1/125s. Many photographers found this capability an advantage for the use of "fill flash" in daylight.

=== Prototype cameras ===
==== OM-X ====
During development, the Olympus design team led by Yoshihisa Maitani worked on a completely modular set of units called the MDN (Maitani-Darkbox-Normal), which resembled a 35 mm Hasselblad. This camera was built as a prototype, and is sometimes referred to as the OM-X. A more conventional camera which integrated the shutter, film transport, mirror and viewfinder was called the MDS (Maitani-Darkbox-Simple). The MDS developed into what became the OM-1.

== Lenses ==
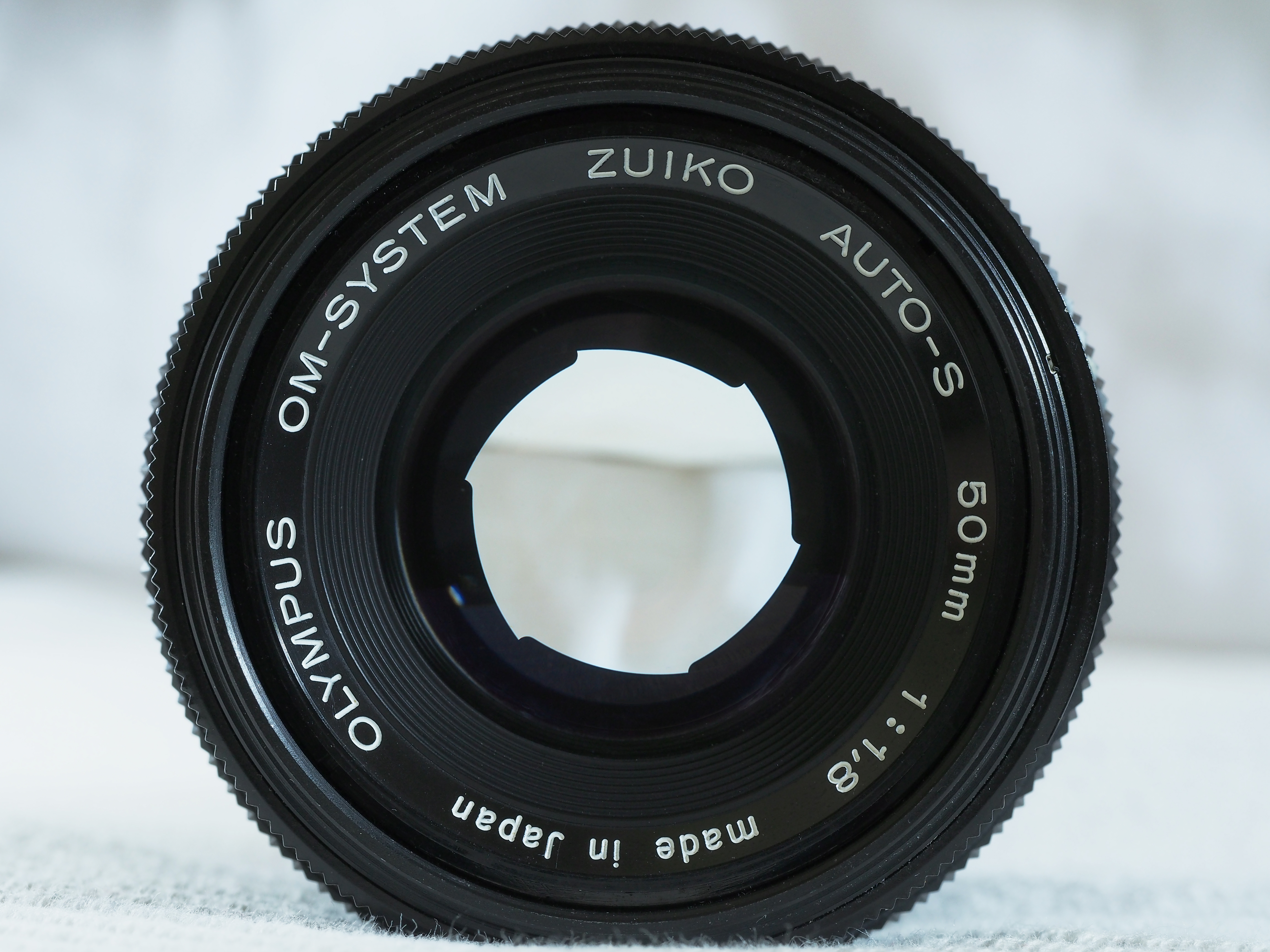
Olympus Zuiko OM 50 mm f/1.8

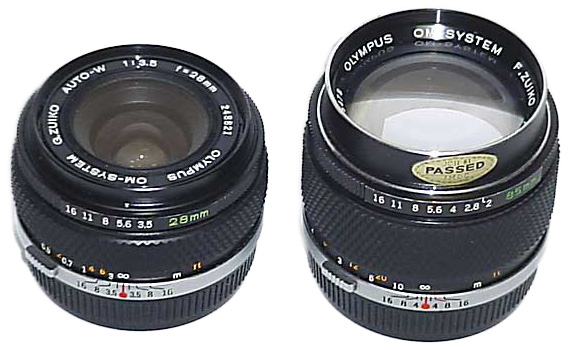
OM system lenses.

The OM Series lenses had the aperture control ring located at the front of the lens barrel. This was done to move it away from the shutter speed control, which was a ring on the camera body concentric with the lens mount. OM lenses also featured a depth-of-field preview button on the lens, in contrast to most other SLR camera systems, in which the button was placed on the camera body.

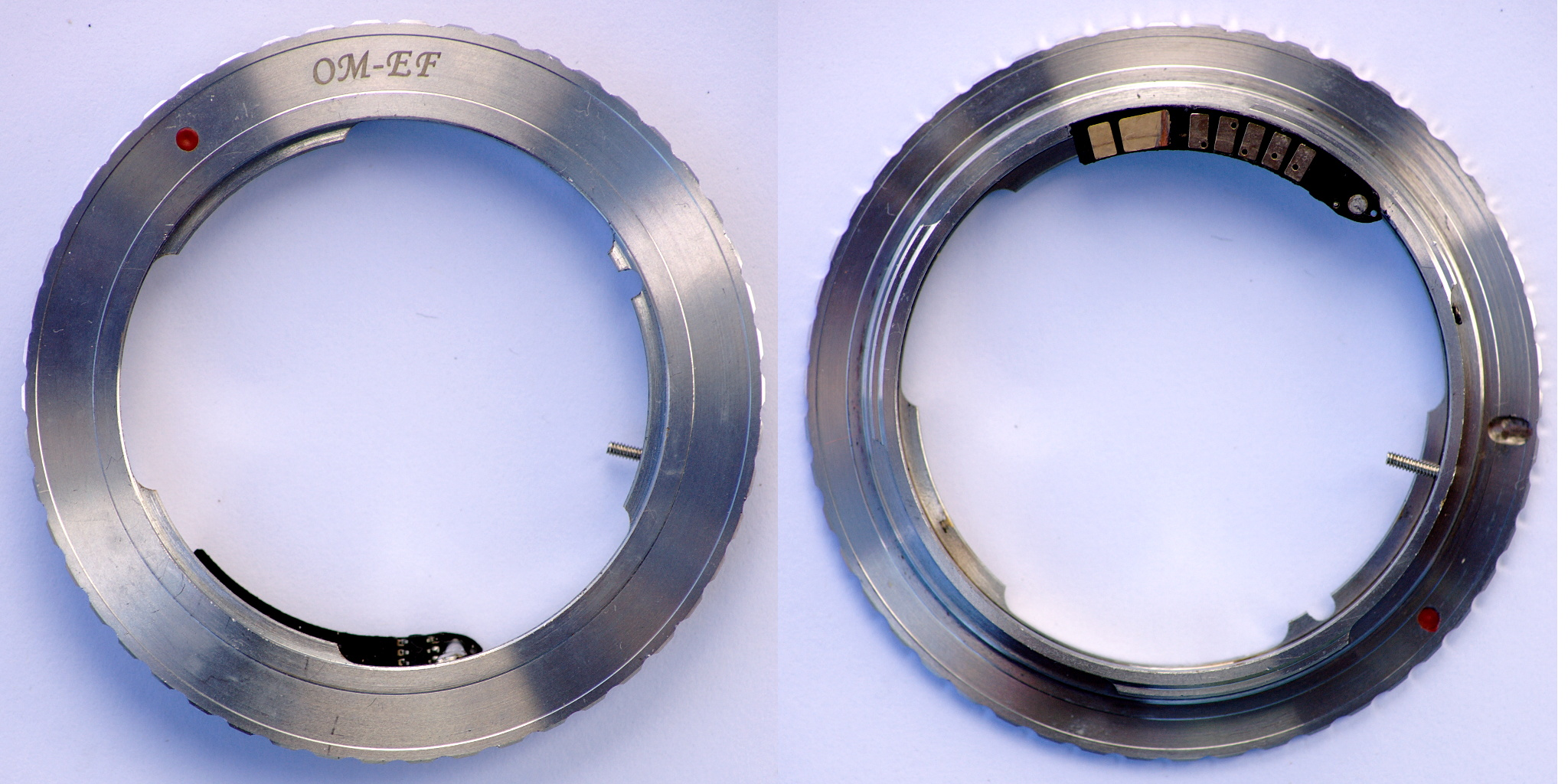
Olympus OM - Canon EOS adapter.

The OM lens was designed to sit 46 mm (measured from the lens mounting ring, or flange) from the film plane. The combination of on-lens aperture control and the generous 'flange focal distance' make OM lenses adaptable (with limited functionality) to a variety of other camera systems – including Canon EOS models – by using a mount-specific adapter.

Zuiko lenses specifications
Lens	Angle of view	Elements – Groups	Diaphragm	Aperture range	Closest focus	Smallest field	Focusing	Weight	Length	Diameter	Hood	Filter
8 mm F2.8 Fisheye	180° (circle)	11–7	Auto	2.8–22	0.2 m	-	Straight helicoid	640 g	82 mm	102 mm	Not necessary	Built-in (L39, Y48, O56, R60)
16 mm F3.5 Fisheye	180°	11–8	Auto	3.5–22	0.2 m	-	Straight helicoid	180 g	31 mm	59 mm	Not necessary	Built-in (L39, Y48, O56)
18 mm F3.5	100°	11–9	Auto	3.5–16	0.25 m	30×20 cm	Straight helicoid	250 g	42 mm	62 mm	49 mm Adapter Ring 49→72	72 mm Screw-in (w.Adapter Ring 49→72)
21 mm F2	92°	11–9	Auto	2–16	0.2 m	21×14 cm	Straight helicoid	250 g	43.5 mm	60 mm	55 mm Screw-in [57 mm Slide-on]	55 mm Screw-in
21 mm F3.5	92°	7–7	Auto	3.5–16	0.2 m	21×14 cm	Straight helicoid	180 g	31 mm	59 mm	49 mm Screw-in	49 mm Screw-in
24 mm F2	84°	10–8	Auto	2–16	0.25 m	23×15 cm	Straight helicoid	280 g	48 mm	60 mm	55 mm Screw-in	55 mm Screw-in
24 mm F2.8	84°	8–7	Auto	2.8–16	0.25 m	23×15 cm	Straight helicoid	180 g	31 mm	59 mm	49 mm Screw-in	49 mm Screw-in
24 mm F3.5 Shift	84° (100° at max. shift)	12-10	Manual	3.5–22	0.35 m	36×24 cm	Rotating cam(Inner focus)	510 g	75 mm	84 mm	Fixed	Built-in (neutral, Y48, O56, R60)
28 mm F2	75°	9–8	Auto	2–16	0.3 m	27×18 cm	Straight helicoid	250 g	43 mm	60 mm	49 mm Screw-in	49 mm Screw-in
28 mm F2.8	75°	6–6	Auto	2.8–22	0.3 m	18×27 cm	Straight helicoid	170 g	32 mm	60 mm	49 mm Screw-in	49 mm Screw-in
28 mm F3.5	75°	7–7	Auto	3.5–16	0.3 m	18×27 cm	Straight helicoid	180 g	31 mm	59 mm	49 mm Screw-in	49 mm Screw-in
35 mm F2	63°	8–7	Auto	2–16	0.3 m	21×14 cm	Straight helicoid	240 g	42 mm	60 mm	55 mm Screw-in	55 mm Screw-in
35 mm F2.8	63°	7–6	Auto	2.8–16	0.3 m	21×14 cm	Straight helicoid	180 g	33 mm	59 mm	51 mm Slide-on	49 mm Screw-in
35 mm F2.8 Shift	63° (83° at max. shift)	8–7	Manual	2.8–22	0.3 m	21×14 cm	Straight helicoid	310 g	58 mm	68 mm	49 mm Screw-in	49 mm Screw-in
40 mm F2	56°	6–6	Auto	2–16	0.3 m	18×12 cm	Straight helicoid	140 g	25 mm	60 mm	49 mm Screw-in	49 mm Screw-in
50 mm F1.2	47°	7–6	Auto	1.2–16	0.45 m	24×16 cm	Straight helicoid	285 g	43 mm	65 mm	51 mm Slide-on	49 mm Screw-in
50 mm F1.4	47°	7–6	Auto	1.4–16	0.45 m	24×16 cm	Straight helicoid	230 g	36 mm [40 mm]	60 mm	51 mm Slide-on	49 mm Screw-in
50 mm F1.8	47°	6–5 [6–4]	Auto	1.8–16	0.45 m	24×16 cm	Straight helicoid	170 g [165 g]	31 mm [32 mm]	59 mm [61 mm]	51 mm Slide-on	49 mm Screw-in
50 mm F2Macro	47°	9–7	Auto	2–16	0.24 m	7.2×4.8 cm	Straight helicoid	320 g	55 mm	69 mm	Not necessary	55 mm Screw-in
50 mm F3.5Macro	47°	5–4	Auto	3.5–22	0.23 m	7.2×4.8 cm	Straight helicoid	200 g	40 mm	60 mm	Not necessary	49 mm Screw-in
55 mm F1.2	43°	7–6	Auto	1.2–16	0.45 m	23×15 cm	Straight helicoid	310 g	47 mm	65 mm	57 mm Slide-on	55 mm Screw-in
85 mm F2	29°	6–4 [5–4]	Auto	2–16	0.85 m	25×17 cm	Straight helicoid	260 g	46 mm	60 mm	49 mm Screw-in	49 mm Screw-in
90 mm F2Macro	27°	9–9	Auto	2–22	0.4 m	7.2×4.8 cm	Straight helicoid	550 g	71 mm	72 mm	57 mm Slide-on	55 mm Screw-in
100 mm F2	24°	7–6	Auto	2–22	0.7 m	18×12 cm	Straight helicoid	520 g	72 mm	70 mm	Built-in	55 mm Screw-in
100 mm F2.8	24°	5–5	Auto	2.8–22	1m	29×19 cm	Straight helicoid	230 g	48 mm	60 mm	49 mm Screw-in	49 mm Screw-in
135 mm F2.8	18°	5–5	Auto	2.8–22	1.5 m	32×21 cm	Straight helicoid	360 g	80 mm	61 mm	Built-in	55 mm Screw-in
135 mm F3.5	18°	5–4	Auto	3.5–22	1.5 m	32×21 cm	Straight helicoid	290 g	73 mm	60 mm	Built-in	49 mm Screw-in
180 mm F2	14°	10–8	Auto	2–22	1.6 m	25×17 cm	Rotating cam (Inner focus)	1,900 g	174 mm	113 mm	Built-in	100 mm Screw-in
180 mm F2.8	14°	5–5	Auto	2.8–32	2 m	32×21 cm	Straight helicoid	700 g	124 mm	80 mm	Built-in	72 mm Screw-in
200 mm F4	12°	5–4	Auto	4–32	2.5 m	36×24 cm	Straight helicoid	510 g	127 mm	67 mm	Built-in	55 mm Screw-in
200 mm F5	12°	6–5	Auto	5–32	2.5 m	36×25 cm	Straight helicoid	380 g	105 mm	62 mm	Built-in	49 mm Screw-in
250 mm F2	10°	12–9	Auto	2–22	2.2 m	25×17 cm	Rotating cam (Inner focus)	3,900 g	246 mm	142 mm	Built-in	Slip-in (46 mm rear filter)
300 mm F4.5	8°	6–4	Auto	4.5–32	3.5 m	33×22 cm	Straight helicoid	1,100 g (1,020 g without tripod collar)	181 mm	80 mm	Built-in	72 mm Screw-in
350 mm F2.8	7°	9–7	Auto	2.8–32	3 m	25×17 cm	Rotating cam (Inner focus)	3,900 g	280 mm	142 mm	Built-in	Slip-in (46 mm rear filter)
400 mm F6.3	6°	5–5	Auto	6.3–32	5 m	36×24 cm	Straight helicoid	1,300 g	255 mm	80 mm	Built-in	72 mm Screw-in
500 mm F8 Reflex	5°	5–2	-	F8 (Single aperture)	4 m	28×19 cm	Straight helicoid	590 g	97 mm	81 mm	Built-in	72 mm Screw-in
600 mm F6.5	4°	6–4	Auto	6.5–32	11 m	55×37 cm	Rack and pinion	2,800 g	377 mm	110 mm	Built-in	100 mm Screw-in
1000 mm F11	2.5°	5–5	Auto	11–45	30 m	98×65 cm	Rack and pinion	4,000 g [4,150 g]	662 mm	110 mm	Built-in	100 mm Screw-in
28–48 mm F4	75°–49°	8–8	Auto	4–22	0.65 m	74×49 cm (28 mm) 46×31 cm (48 mm)	Rotating helicoid	300 g	54 mm (at 48 mm setting)	65 mm	55 mm Screw-in	49 mm Screw-in
35–70 mm F3.5–4.5	63°–34°	9–8	Auto	3.5–22	0.45 m	21.7×14.5 cm (close focus, 70 mm)	Rotating helicoid	190 g	51 mm	62 mm	51 mm Slip-on	49 mm Screw-in
35–70 mm F3.5–4.8	63°–34°	7–7	Auto	3.5–22 (35 mm) 4.8–32 (70 mm)	0.4 m	22×15 cm	Straight helicoid	185 g	65 mm	63 mm	52 mm Screw-in	52 mm Screw-in
35–70 mm F3.6	63°–34°	10–8	Auto	3.6–22	0.8 m	72×48 cm (35 mm) 37.5×25 cm (70 mm)	Straight helicoid	400 g	74 mm	67 mm	60 mm Slide-on	55 mm Screw-in
35–70 mm F4	64°–34°	7–7	Auto	4–22	0.75 m	72×48 cm (35 mm) 36×24 cm (70 mm)	Straight helicoid	385 g	71 mm	69 mm	57 mm Slide-on	55 mm Screw-in
35–70 mm F4 Auto Focus	63°–34°	9–8	Auto	4–22	0.75 m	72×48 cm (35 mm) 36×24 cm (70 mm)	Rotating helicoid	550 g (without batteries)	70 mm	92 mm	55 mm Screw-in	55 mm Screw-in
35–80 mm F2.8	63°–30°	16–14	Auto	2.8–22	0.6 m	62×41 cm (35 mm) 31×20 cm (80 mm)	rotating focusing helicoid, rotating cam zoomring	650 g	99 mm	69 mm	Bayonet mount	62 mm Screw-in
35–105 mm F3.5–4.5	63°–23°	16–12	Auto	3.5–22 (35 mm) 4.5–22 (105 mm)	1.5 m (0.31 m at close focus)	129×86 cm (35 mm) 45×30 cm (105 mm) close focus: 18×12 cm (35 mm) 25×17 cm (105 mm)	rotating focusing helicoid and push-pull zoomring	470 g	85 mm	64 mm	55 mm Screw-in	55 mm Screw-in
50–250 mm F5	47°–10°	13–10	Auto	5–32	1.80 m (1.53 m at 250 mm, close focus)	103×69 cm (50 mm) 22×14 cm (250 mm)	rotating focusing helicoid and push-pull zoomring	780 g	140 mm	72 mm	Built-in	55 mm Screw-in
65–200 mm F4	37°–12°	14–11	Auto	4–32	1.2 m (0.85 m at close focus, 200 mm)	48×32 cm (65 mm) 17×11 cm (200 mm) 12×8 cm (200 mm, close focus)	rotating focusing helicoid and push-pull zoomring	730 g	147 mm	71 mm	Built-in	55 mm Screw-in
70–210 mm F4.5–5.6	34°–11°	10–7	Auto	4.5–22 (70 mm) 5.6–28 (210 mm)	1.14 m	?	Straight helicoid	335 g	103 mm	63 mm	52 mm Screw-in	52 mm Screw-in
75–150 mm F4	32°–16°	15–11	Auto	4–22	1.6 m	64×42 cm (75 mm) 32×21 cm (150 mm)	Revolving helicoid	440 g	115 mm	63 mm	Built-in	49 mm Screw-in
85–250 mm F5	29°–10°	15–11	Auto	5–32	2 m	66–44 cm (85 mm) 23×15 cm (250 mm)	Revolving helicoid	890 g	196 mm	70 mm	Built-in	55 mm Screw-in
100–200 mm F5	24°–12°	9–6	Auto	5–32	2.4 m	69×46 cm (100 mm) 37×25 cm (200 mm)	rotating focusing helicoid and push-pull zoomring	570 g	148 mm	63 mm	Built-in	49 mm Screw-in
20 mm F2	9° at highest magnifi-cation	6–4	Auto	2–16	-	0.86×0.57 cm (4.2×) 0.26×0.18 cm (13.6×)	with Auto Bellows, 65–116, Auto Extension Tube 14, 15; fine focusing straight helicoid built-in	170 g	46 mm	60 mm	not necessary	-
20 mm F3.5	9° at highest magnifi-cation	4–3	Manual	3.5–16	-	0.84×0.56 cm (4.3×) 0.29×0.19 cm (12.4×)	with Auto Bellows	70 g	20 mm	32 mm	Not necessary	21 mm Slide-on
38 mm F2.8	9° athighest magnifi-cation	6–4	Auto	2.8–22	-	0.21×0.14 cm (1.7×) 0.54×0.36 cm (6.7×)	with Auto Bellows, 65–116, Auto Extension Tube 14, 15; fine focusing straight helicoid built-in.	170 g	46 mm	60 mm	Not necessary	-
38 mm F3.5	9° at highest magnification	5–4	Manual	3.5–16	-	0.20×0.13 cm (1.8×) 0.59×0.39 cm (6.1×)	with Auto Bellows	90 g	28 mm	43 mm	Not necessary	32 mm Slide-on
80 mm F4 (Manual)	9° at highest magnifi-cation	6–4	Manual	4–22	-	7.20×4.80 cm (2.3×) 1.80×1.20 cm (2.0×)	with Auto Bellows	200 g	46 mm	59 mm	Not necessary	49 mm Screw-in
80 mm F4 (Auto)	9° athighest magnifi-cation	6–4	Auto	4–32	0.23 m	7.20×4.80 cm (2.3×) 1.80×1.20 cm (2.0×)	with Auto Bellows, 65–116; fine focusing straight helicoid built-in	170 g	33 mm	60 mm	not necessary	49 mm Screw-in
135 mm F4.5	18°	5–4	Auto	4.5–45	0.6 m	7.2×4.8 cm	with Auto Bellows, 65–116; fine focusing straight helicoid built-in	320 g	47 mm	60 mm	57 mm Slide-on	55 mm Screw-in
24 mm F2.8AF	84°	8–7	Automatic control on camerabody	2.8–22	0.25 m	24×16 cm	Driven by AF/PF coupler on camera body	170 g	32 mm	62 mm	Built-in	49 mm Screw-in
28 mm F2.8AF	75°	6–6	Automatic control on camera body	2.8–22	0.3 m	27×18 cm	Driven by AF/PF coupler on camera body	170 g	32 mm	62 mm	Built-in	49 mm Screw-in
50 mm F1.8AF	47°	6–5	Automatic control on camera body	1.8–22	0.45 m	24×16 cm	Driven by AF/PF coupler on camera body	170 g	32 mm	62 mm	Built-in	49 mm Screw-in
50 mm F2PF	47°	6–4	Automatic control on camera body	2–22	0.45 m	24×16 cm	Driven by PF coupler on camera body	150 g	37 mm	64 mm	Slide-on	49 mm Screw-in
50 mm F2.8AF Macro	47°	8–7	Automatic controlon camera body	2.8–32	0.2 m	3.6×2.4 cm	Driven by AF/PF coupler on camera body	340 g	57 mm	66 mm	Built-in	49 mm Screw-in
28–85 mm F3.5–4.5AF	75°–29°	14–11	Automatic control on camera body	3.5–22 (28 mm) 4.5–27 (85 mm)	0.8 m (at close focus: 0.6 m)	85×57 cm (28 mm) 22×15 cm (85 mm)	Driven by AF/PF coupler on camera body	480 g	84 mm	69 mm	Slide-on	55 mm Screw-in
35–70 mm F3.5–4.5AF	63°–34°	9–8	Automatic control on camera body	3.5–22 (35 mm) 4.5–32 (70 mm)	0.75 m (at close focus: 0.45 m)	40.4×27 cm (35 mm) 21.7×14.5 cm (70 mm, close focus)	Driven by AF/PF coupler on camera body	250 g	53 mm	69 mm	Slide-on	49 mm Screw-in
35–70 mm F3.5–4.5PF	63°–34°	9–8	Automatic control on camera body	3.5–22 (35 mm) 4.5–32 (70 mm)	0.75 m (at close focus 0.45 m)	40.4×27 cm (35 mm) 21.7×14.5 cm (70 mm, close focus)	Driven by PF coupler on camera body	250 g	53 mm	69 mm	Slide-on	49 mm Screw-in
35–105 mm F3.5–4.5AF	63°–23°	14–13	Automatic control on camera body	3.5–22 (35 mm) 4.5–27 (105 mm)	1.5 m (at close focus: 0.85 m)	129×86 cm (35 mm) 22×14 cm (105 mm, close focus)	Driven by AF/PF coupler on camera body	460 g	84 mm	69 mm	Slide-on	55 mm Screw-in
70–210 mm F3.5–4.5AF	34°–11°	12–9	Automatic control on camera body	3.5–22 (70 mm) 4.5–32 (210 mm)	1.5 m (at close focus: 1.35 m)	52×34 cm (70 mm) 18×12 cm (210 mm, close focus)	Driven by AF/PF coupler on camera body	790 g	125 mm	76 mm	Slide-on	55 mm Screw-in

== Prototype lenses ==
Manual Zuiko lenses that were never marketed:

- 18 mm/f3.5, prototype of 18 mm/f3.5, L.zuiko with 12 elements 10 group, fixed 72 mm thread
- 50 mm/f2 pancake, prototype of 40 mm/f2 pancake
- 85 mm/f1.4, prototype, with GRIN (GRadient INdex of Refraction) elements
- 160 mm/f3.5, prototype
- 300 mm/f6.3, prototype
- 400 mm/f4.5, prototype
- 500 mm/f5.6, prototype
- 800 mm/f9, prototype
- 1200 mm/f14, prototype
- 24–40 mm/f4, prototype
- 90–250 mm prototype of 85–250/5

== Accessories ==
Being a system, Olympus made numerous accessories for professional portrait, photo journalism, sport photography and scientific photography.

- motor drives and exchangeable camera back for 250 exposures
- lighting: dedicated flashes, shoes, cords, connectors, power sources, adapters and filters
- interchangeable focusing screens instead of bulkier exchangeable finders
- macrophotography: extension tubes, stands & bases, lightings and accessories
- microphotography: systems and connecting, focusing, automatic and manual exposure units
- technical photography: data recording backs, endoscope and astrophotography adapters
- cases, grips, cable release, battery holders

Olympus focusing screens for OM
Type	Image	Field	Center focusing aid	Notes
1-1		Ground matte Fresnel	Microprism spot	Suitable for general photography.
1-2		Ground matte Fresnel	Microprism spot	For longer telephoto lenses
1-3		Ground matte Fresnel	Split-image rangefinder (horizontal) spot	Suitable for general photography.
1-4		Ground matte Fresnel	[none]	Suitable for general photography.
1-5		Clear Fresnel	Microprism spot	For wide-angle lenses
1-6		Clear Fresnel	Microprism spot	For standard and telephoto lenses
1-7		Clear Fresnel	Microprism spot	For super telephoto lenses
1-8		Ground matte Fresnel	[none]	For super telephoto lenses
1-8 (early)		Ground matte Fresnel	All microprism	For wide angle lenses
1-9		Clear Fresnel	[none]	For endoscopic photography, with 23 mm inscribed circle
1-9 (early)		Ground matte Fresnel	All microprism	For normal and telephoto lenses
1-10		Ground matte Fresnel	[none]	Includes horizontal and vertical grid lines
1-11		Ground matte Fresnel	Cross-hair reticle	For close-up and photomacrography
1-12		Clear Fresnel	Cross-hair reticle	For photomicrography and greater than life-size photomacrography
1-13		Ground matte Fresnel	Split-image rangefinder (horizontal) spot with microprism collar	Suitable for general photography. Default.
1-14		Ground matte Fresnel	Split-image rangefinder (diagonal) spot with microprism collar	Suitable for general photography.

== See also ==
- Four Thirds System
- Micro Four Thirds system, a derivative of the Four Thirds system specifically geared to digital mirrorless interchangeable-lens cameras (MILCs)
- Olympus OM-D series, the 2012 resurrection of the Olympus OM System
