= Olympus OM-4 =

Interchangeable-lens, 35 mm film single lens reflex (SLR) camera

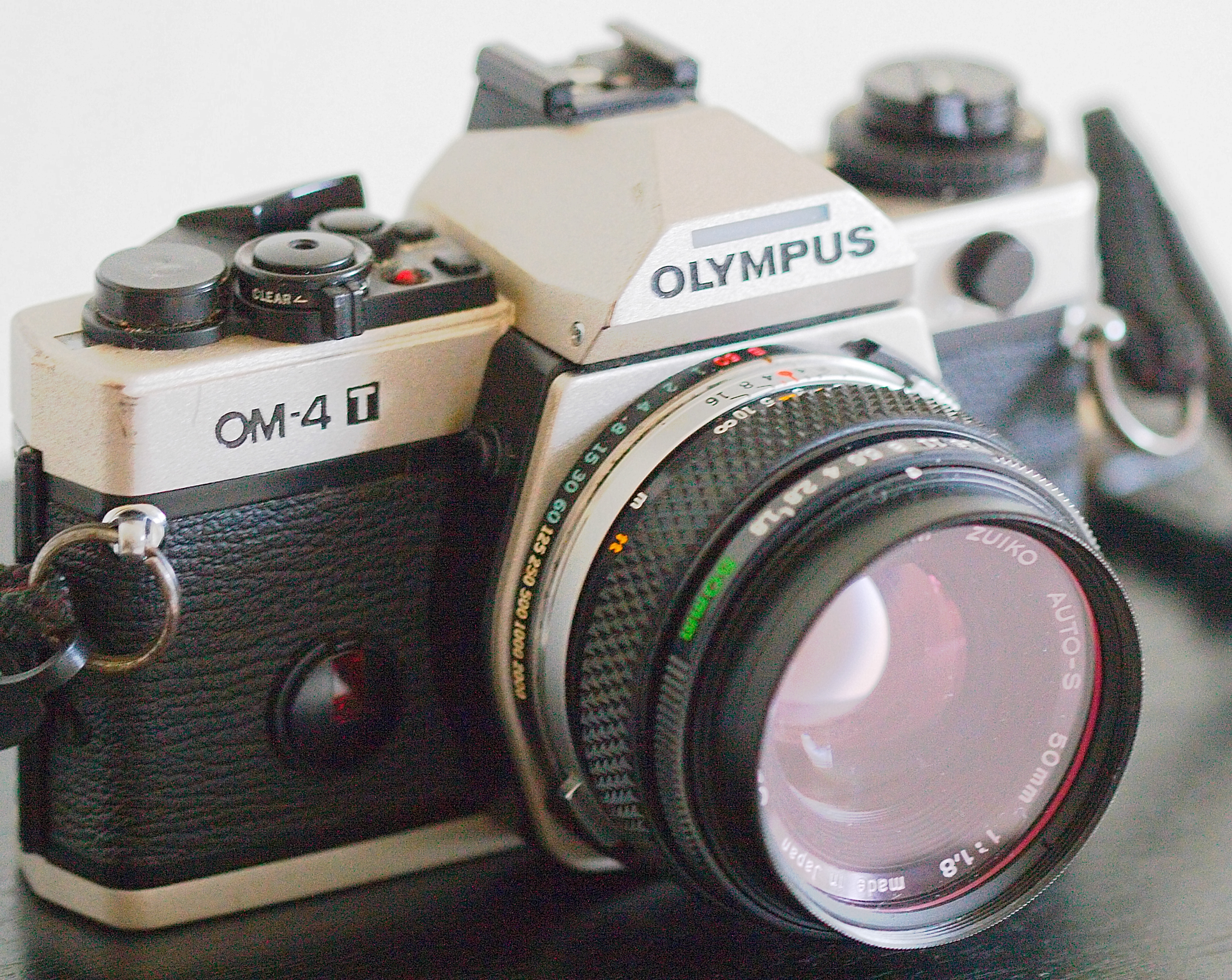
- OM-4T (OM-4Ti)

Overview
- Maker: Olympus
- Type: SLR
- Released: 1983 OM-4; 1987 OM-4Ti (champagne); 1990 OM-4 Ti (black)
- Production: 1983-1987 OM-4; 1987-2002 OM-4Ti

Lens
- Lens mount: Olympus OM mount

Sensor/medium
- Recording medium: 135 film

Focusing
- Focus: Manual focus

Exposure/metering
- Exposure: Manual

Flash
- Flash: Hot shoe

Shutter
- Frame rate: manually wound
- Shutter speed range: 1 s – 1/2000 s; Bulb

General
- Dimensions: 136×84×50 mm (5.4×3.3×2.0 in)
- Weight: 540 g (19 oz) (OM-4); 510 g (18 oz) (OM-4Ti)
- Made in: Japan

Chronology
- Successor: Olympus OM-4Ti

The Olympus OM-4 is a professional interchangeable-lens, 35 mm film, single lens reflex (SLR) camera; manufactured by Olympus Optical Co., Ltd. (today Olympus Corporation) in Japan, and sold as OM-4 from 1983 to 1987 and as OM-4Ti from 1986 to 2002.

== History ==
The OM-4 was the successor to the OM-2N and represented the highest evolution of the Olympus OM-series SLRs (introduced in 1972). Other Olympus OM top models were the OM-1, OM-2, OM-1N, OM-2N, OM-2 Spot Program, OM-3 and OM-3Ti. They all used the same body configuration, but with developing aluminum alloy chassis, electronics, feature levels, and external controls and cosmetics.

== Features ==
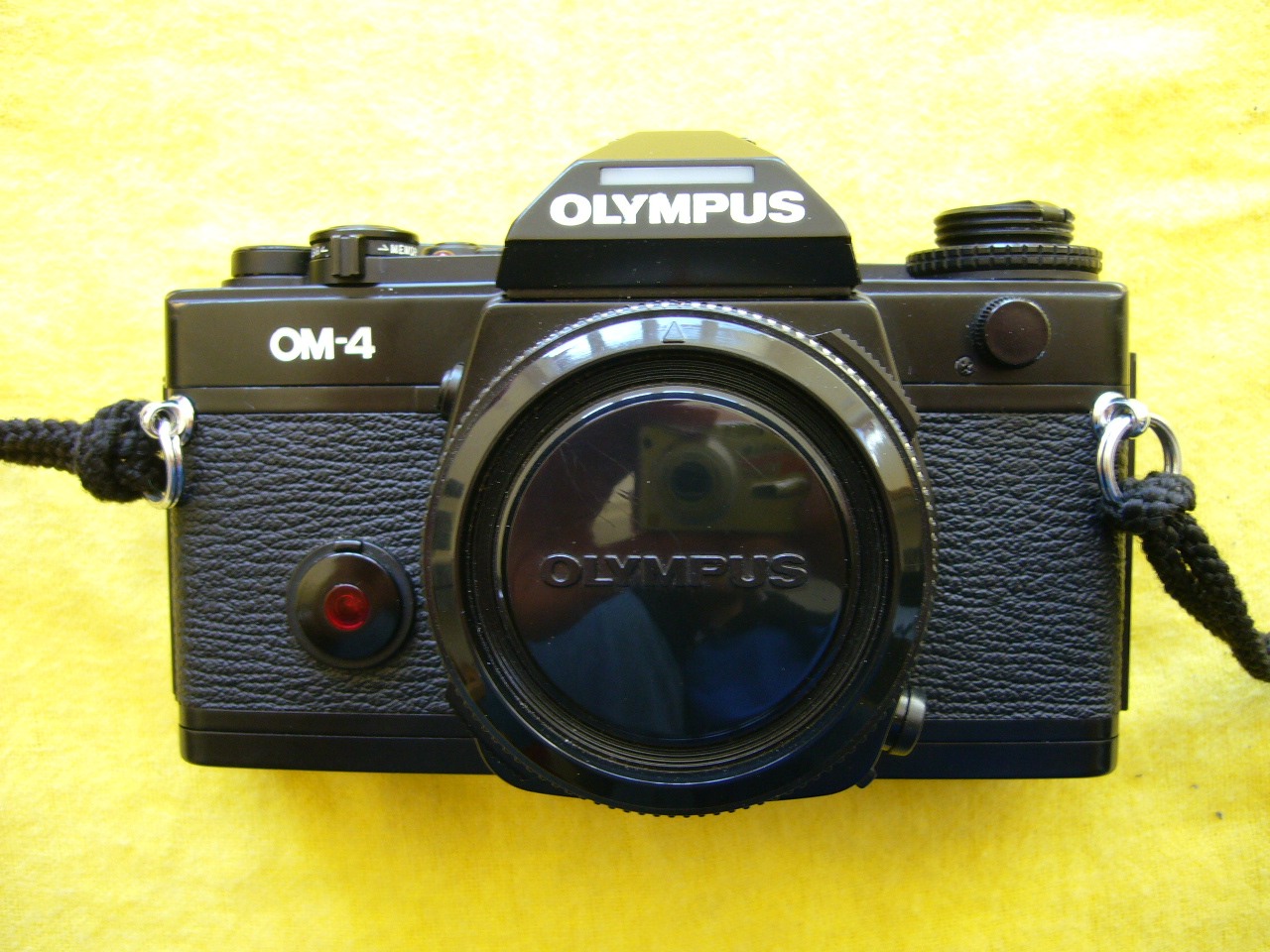
Frontal view of an OM-4 camera body, without lens attached

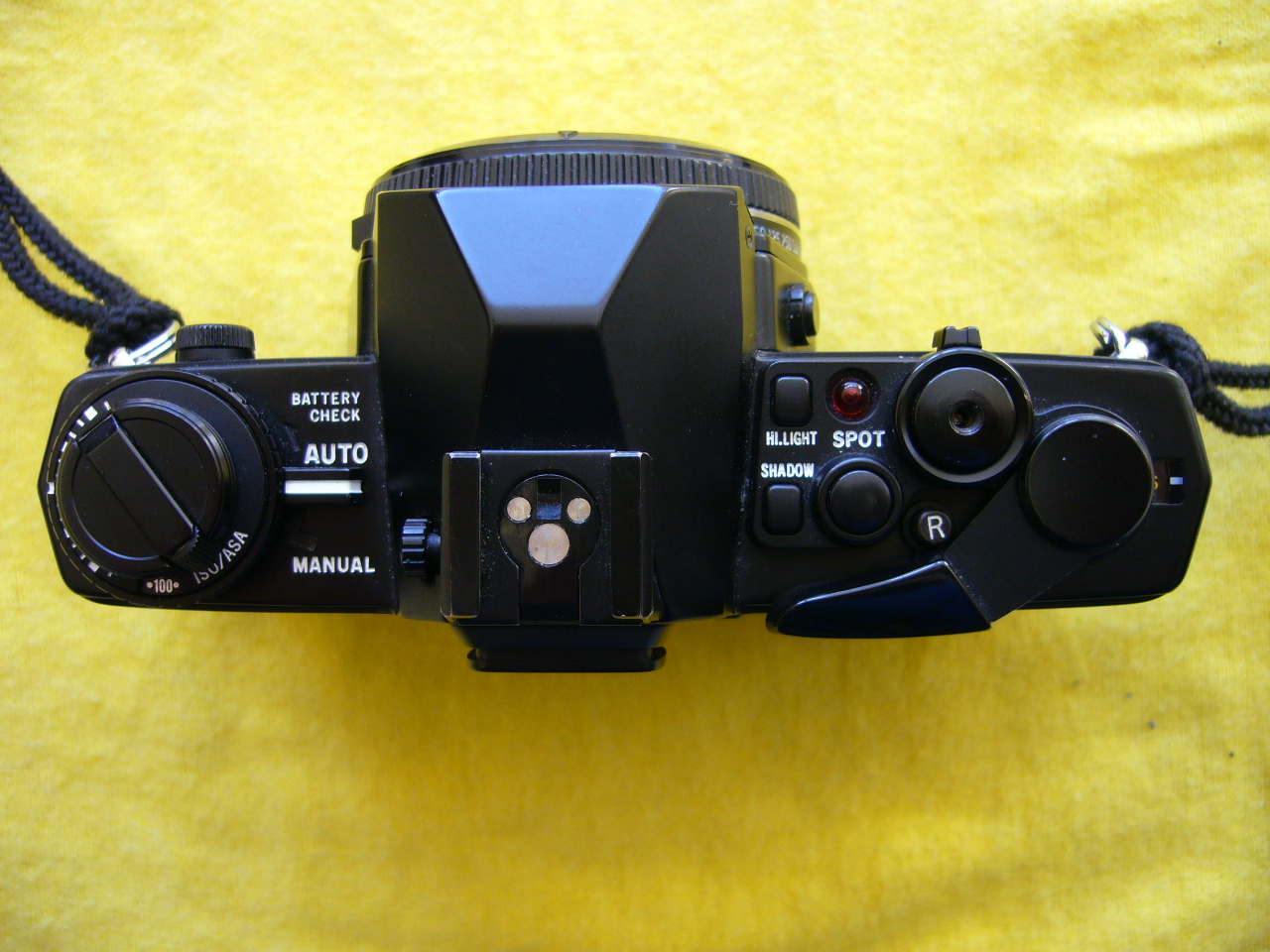
Top view of an OM-4 camera body, showing controls

The OM-4 used a horizontal cloth focal plane shutter with a manual speed range of one second - 1/2000 second (up to 240 seconds was possible in automatic mode), plus bulb and flash X-sync of 1/60 second. Unlike most SLRs of the era, the OM-4 used a familiar OM-series shutter-speed ring, concentric with the lens mount, instead of a top-mounted shutter speed dial.

The OM-4 accepted all Olympus-made OM bayonet-mount lenses, which were marketed under the Zuiko brand name.

The OM-4 was a battery-dependent (requiring two 1.5-volt silver oxide SR44, V76, 357 cells - use of a 3-volt 1/3N lithium cell is not recommended) electro-mechanically controlled manual-focus SLR with manual exposure control or aperture-priority auto-exposure.

The OM-4 was the first camera with a built-in multi-spot exposure meter (2% of view; 3.3˚ with 50 mm lens) which could take up to eight spot measurements and average them. Another unique feature was the selectable option to assess the darkest or brightest part of the scene, the camera adjusting the exposure based on that measure. The light meter used a dual-concentric segmented silicon photodiode to provide spot or center-weighted readings. It used a graduated, linear LCD shutter speed display at the bottom of the viewfinder to precisely indicate its readings versus the actual camera settings.

The major improvements of the OM-4 compared to the OM-2N were the stronger chassis, gasket weatherproofing, permanently affixed, dedicated hot shoe and TTL flash cable connector, linear liquid crystal display (LCD) shutter speed display, provision for spot-metering, and flexible integrated-circuit electronics.

Accessories for the OM-4 included all the Olympus motor drives made for the OM-System cameras. Motor Drive 2 was introduced with the OM-4 and, in addition to automatic film advance (up to 5 frames per second), featured motorized film rewind. The camera accepted the Olympus 250-exposure bulk film back (10 meters of film = 250 frames) and the Olympus T-system flashes. The T45 handle-mount electronic flash (guide number 148/45 (feet/meters) at ASA/ISO 100) was also introduced with the OM-4.

The original OM-4 was available in only one color: all black. The introductory US list price for the body only (no lens) was $685. Note that SLRs usually sold for 30 to 40 percent below list price.

The camera dimensions are 87 mm height, 139 mm width, 50 mm depth and 540 grams (19 oz) weight.

== Design history ==
The Olympus OM-series SLRs were influential in SLR design changes in the 1970s and 1980s, with intense competition between the major SLR brands: Olympus, Nikon, Canon, Minolta and Pentax. Between about 1975 and 1985, there was a dramatic shift away from heavy all-metal manual mechanical camera bodies to much more compact bodies with integrated-circuit (IC) electronic automation. In addition, because of rapid advances in electronics, the brands continually leapfrogged each other as they brought out models with new or automated features. The OM-1 introduced the compact body size that inspired similar sized SLRs of competing manufacturers (Pentax M series, Nikon FE/FM). Through-the-lens (TTL) off-the-film (OTF) metering (including electronic flash control) was pioneered by the OM-2 in 1974, refined in the OM-2n, OM-2SP and OM-4 models and remained unique to Olympus until the introduction of the Pentax LX in 1980.

The OM-4 and its mechanically controlled companion the OM-3 were quite conservative designs, despite their very sophisticated spot-meters. They can be described as the OM-2 and OM-1 with electronic spot-meter controls grafted on. The OM-4's deliberately limited, but tightly focused, features were not intended to appeal to beginners. Instead of offering every possible automated 'bell and whistle', the OM-4's manual spot-metering represented Olympus's intention to provide precision for the professional and advanced amateur photographer.

In 1986, a special ultra-durable version of the OM-4 with champagne-colored titanium top and bottom plates, upgraded electronic circuitry and improved weatherproofing, called the OM-4Ti (OM-4T in the USA), was released, with a US list price of $770.

The OM-4Ti also introduced a new electronic flash-control system. Normally focal-plane shutters are limited in their maximum flash synchronization speed, because of the way they provide fast shutter speeds – timing the second shutter curtain to close more quickly after the first shutter curtain opens. This causes a narrowing of the slit "wiping" the exposure on the film. In effect, a horizontal focal-plane shutter made of cloth is only fully open and usable for flash exposure up to 1/60s. Any faster and a typical one-millisecond flash burst would only partially expose the film - the part open to the slit. The OM-4Ti overcame this problem by having the new Olympus F280 Full Synchro flash pulse its light continuously over 40 milliseconds, long enough to illuminate the slit as it crossed the entire focal plane, even at shutter speeds as fast as 1/2000s. There is, however, a concomitant loss of flash range.

A black-finished version of the OM-4T came out in 1990, listing for $1250 (the champagne-finished body remained available for $1200).

In the US market the OM-4T was renamed OM-4Ti in 1997 ($1819 list) and was discontinued in 2002.
