= Olympus OM-2 =

OM-2
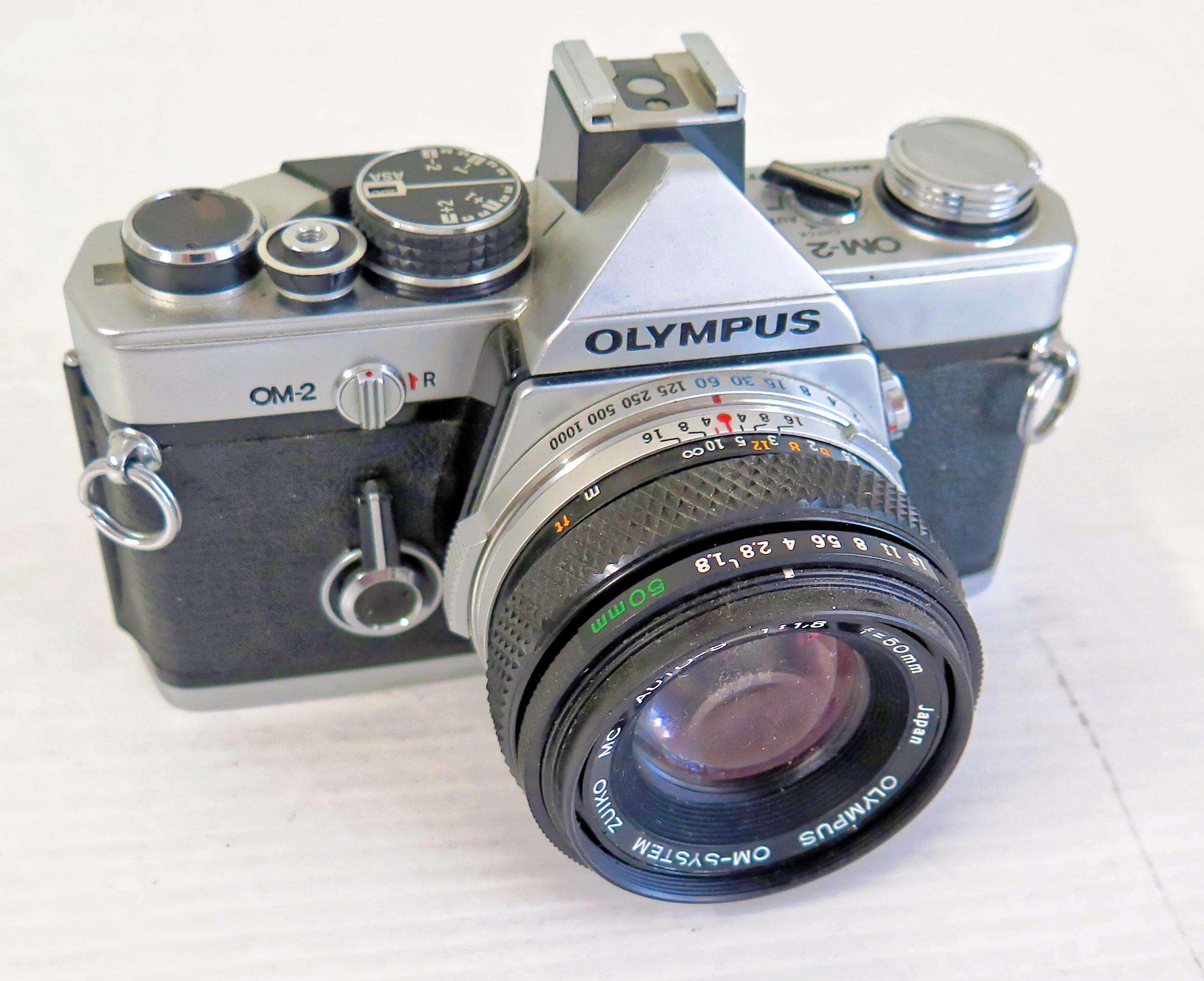
- Olympus OM-2

Overview
- Maker: Olympus
- Type: 35 mm single-lens reflex (SLR)
- Released: 1975 OM-2; 1979 OM-2 MD; 1979 OM-2n; 1984 OM-2SP.
- Production: 1975-1988

Lens
- Lens mount: Olympus OM

Focusing
- Focus: Manual

Exposure/metering
- Exposure: Manual; 1/1000 ~ 1 s, bulb (B), aperture priority (A_{v})
- Exposure metering: Off-the-film (OTF) TTL

Flash
- Flash: Hot shoe, PC socket

Shutter
- Frame rate: manually wound

General
- Dimensions: 136×83×50 mm (5.4×3.3×2.0 in)
- Weight: 520 g (18 oz) (OM-2); 520 g (18 oz) (OM-2n)
- Made in: Japan

Chronology
- Successor: Olympus OM-4

The Olympus OM-2 is a professional single-lens reflex (SLR) film system camera manufactured by Olympus Optical Co., Ltd., later Olympus Corporation, in Japan between 1975 and 1988.

== Main features ==
The Olympus OM-2 is an aperture-priority automatic-exposure camera (with full manual operation selected via switch), based on the earlier, successful Olympus OM-1 body. The OM-2 was introduced in 1975, and combined the light, sturdy camera body style of the manual-only OM-1 with a new automatic exposure system.

One of the main selling points of the OM-2 was that all the OM-1 accessories and lenses would fit without modification, offering a compact system and an easy upgrade path for OM-1 owners.

A number of famous photographers used the OM-2, including Patrick Lichfield, Kon Sasaki, Don McCullin, Roy Morsch, Jacques Schumacher, Robert Semeniuk, and James Sugar.

== Technical details ==
Of the many features the OM-2 boasted, the most commonly advertised feature was that it was the first camera to offer a through-the-lens (TTL) direct metering system for film, named Auto Dynamic Metering (ADM). This "off the film" metering was the method's first ever release in a camera. Another feature of the OM-2 was the integration of two available electronic flash guns into the system. The camera set the duration and intensity of the flash during exposure using its inbuilt sensors by measuring the amount of light reflected off the film. This ensured excellent results under difficult conditions. Exposure calculation was unique thanks to the twin "silicon blue cell" sensors which, for shutter speeds of 1/60s and above, measured light reflected off a graduated patterned surface on the lens side of the shutter. For shutter speeds below 1/60s, exposure was calculated from the amount of light reflected off the film surface during the exposure. The shutter was a horizontal-running cloth type. In auto-exposure mode the camera was capable of giving exposures from 60s-1/1000s (OM-2N, 120s-1/1000s). The camera also offered a metered manual-exposure mode, with speeds of 1s-1/1000s, plus B.

== Physical appearance and features ==
The model series appeared in the following order: OM-2, OM-2 MD, OM-2N MD and thereafter the heavily revised OM-2S/OM-2 Spot Program, which was, essentially, a new mechanism within a similar body.

The OM-2, OM-2 MD and OM-2N MD camera came in chrome or black finish. The OM-2S (In USA) and OM-2 Spot/Program (elsewhere) came only in black.

=== OM-2 and OM-2 MD ===
The principal difference between the OM-2 and OM-2 MD models was the provision of a removable cap on the base-plate to permit attachment of the OM system Motor Drive 1 (or the later Motor Drive 2) for film advance at 5 frames per second and the placement of an "MD" badge on the front left face of the camera. The non-MD badged OM-2 cameras needed to go to a service facility to enable attachment of a motor drive.

There is some confusion about the MD badge that appears at the 4 o'clock position on some OM-2's, but not on others. The general understanding is that all OM-2's are motor drive and winder 1 or 2 capable (and included the coupler opening and removable cap), at least the U.S. "legally imported" ones from Ponder and Best. The re-worked base plates (and other modifications) were only required for early OM-1 models. It's unclear what modifications (if any) were implemented when the "MD" badge appeared in the late 70's models.

OM-2 and OM-2 MD cameras had the hot shoe 2 or 3 for attaching a flash unit. This had the central sync contact plus one other (either in-line or off to the 10-o-clock position when viewed from the rear of the camera) and a single, threaded post on the prism used to secure the shoe or a post with one small recess for a connector pin (Shoe 3). Additionally, the OM-2 and OM-2 MD models had a reset position on the shutter speed dial adjacent to the B setting. This was used to reset the shutter mechanism in the event of mirror lock-up when the batteries were drained.

=== OM-2N MD ===
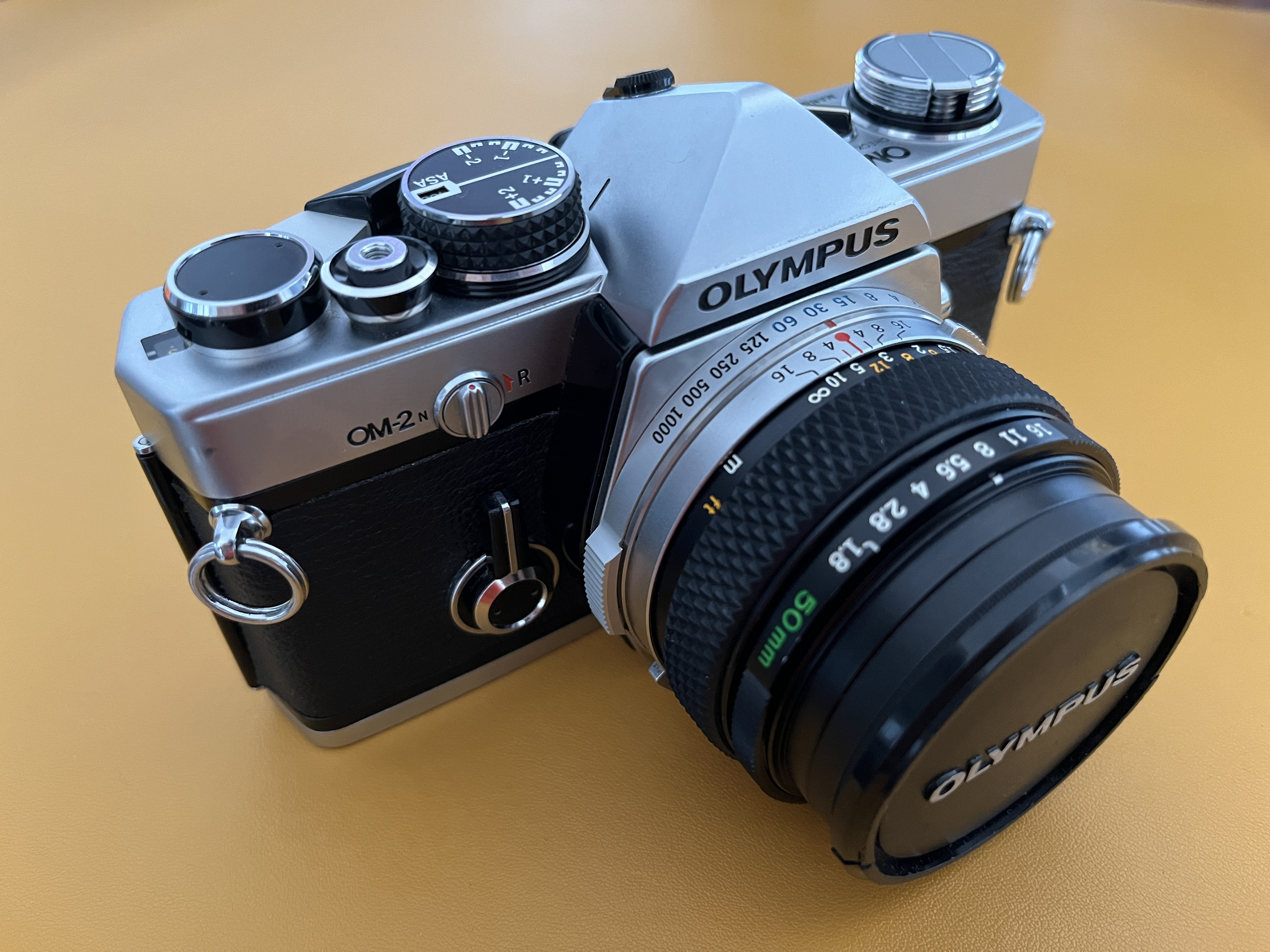
Olympus OM-2N SLR 35mm film camera

The OM-2N MD, manufactured from 1979 to 1984, has a smaller upper-case "N" engraved next to the model number on the front plate at the rewind lever and on the top plate, to the left of the prism. Additionally, the re-set function was moved to the top of the camera via the power-switch and the word "Reset" is engraved next to the word "Check" on the top plate of the camera.

The "N" model had a new, re-contoured advance lever which had smoother, rounded edges as opposed to the OM-2 and OM-2MD's advance lever's slimmer and sharper edges.

The OM-2N MD used hot shoe 4 with two additional contacts above the main central sync point. This shoe used two small pins to make contact with the camera circuitry. For this purpose, an OM-2N MD will have the large securing threaded recess used for shoe 1 on the older OM-2 MD plus two smaller recesses for the added contacts visible on the rear of the prism above the viewfinder. The flash shoes are not backwardly interchangeable between models.

The OM-2N MD added, via the shoe 4 circuitry, the following features to the OM-2 MD: A flash charge-ready light in the viewfinder and correct flash exposure confirmation by flashing this same green LED after exposure.

The "N" also had a contact inside the film chamber for the Recordata back. Finally, if used with a T-Series flash, the flash and shutter would sync at "X" setting regardless of what position the sync switch around the pc-socket was set to.

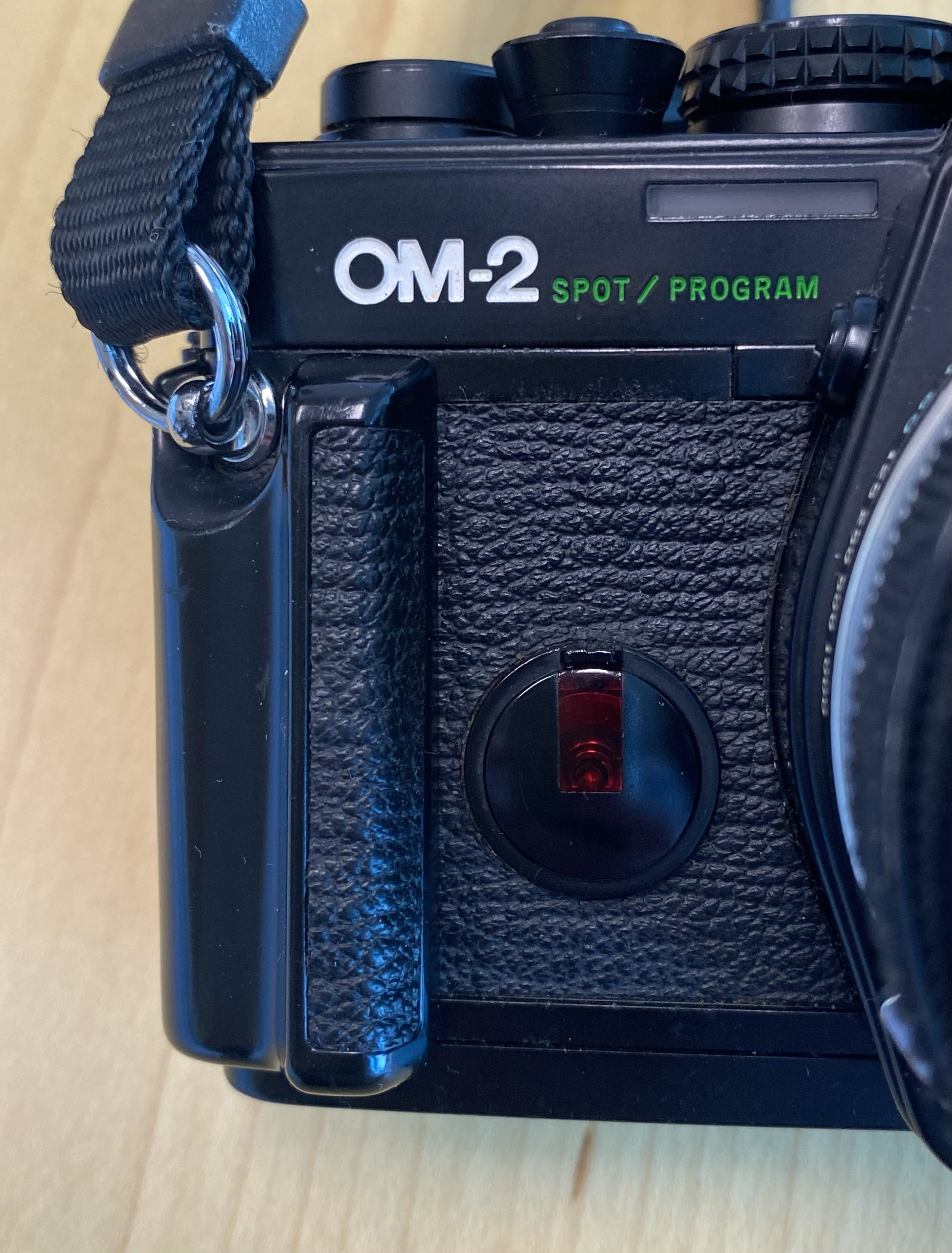
OM-2SP Finger Grip

== OM-2S/OM-2 Spot Program ==
The OM-2SP Spot Program (OM-2S in the USA) was a thorough overhaul of the OM-2 innards to make the model more competitive. It has more commonality with the OM-4 than the previous OM-2, a fact which simplified production for Olympus which had, by the time of the OM-2S launch, released the OM-4 and the OM-3 models. It was manufactured from 1984 to 1988.

The OM-2S used the OM-4 shutter mechanism but without the 1/2000 sec top speed, using instead 1/1000 as the maximum. It did, however, retain its mechanical Bulb setting as well as 1/60 second speed for use when batteries were depleted. This addressed a failing of the older all-electronic OM-2 models which were unusable without batteries. Additionally, a basic level of weather-sealing was provided as a new feature in the OM-2 line. While the older OM-2 models could routinely withstand harsh conditions, they were never advertised as having any environmental protection features.

The OM-2S offered only 3.5 frames per second when coupled to the motor drive 1 or 2.

The camera used an LCD with a 90-second power-saving limiter for metering indications and warnings. This was visible to the left of the viewfinder area.

All the previous focusing screens and accessories (except for the flash shoe attachments) available in the OM system were compatible with the camera.

The camera body had a fixed hot-shoe and a plug on the front-left for coupling of the Olympus flash group's TTL connector cable (previously the OM-2N MD series required removal of the flash shoe and the attachment of a TTL connector to facilitate this).

The rewind release was moved from the front right faceplate to the top of the camera between the ASA setting dial and the advance lever arm.

The OM-2S had three operational modes. The most noted was the provision of a program setting which permitted totally automated selection of aperture and shutter speed by the camera circuitry.

Olympus offered a program mode without the need for modification of existing lenses or the purchase of special program-compatible lenses. The only proviso to using program mode was that the lens in use be set to the highest f-number to permit the program mode to operate. If the aperture was not set to the highest number, the LCD would flash an aperture symbol (and, if activated, the camera beeper would sound) to warn of the problem.

The "Auto" mode operated in much the same manner as the older OM-2N MD offering aperture preferred automatic exposure with averaging metering off the first curtain and/or film to determine which shutter speed would be used for the exposure.

The "Manual" mode metered in the central microprism collar area only (roughly 2% of the field) - giving the spot metering in the camera's model name. Information on the spot metered value was provided on an LCD bar-graph version of the older match-needle system used on the OM-2N MD. Both shutter speed and aperture were under the photographer's control.

Metering circuit changes versus the OM-2/OM-2N

The OM-2S still made use of the direct off the film metering although the OM-2S used a single metering cell in the base of the mirror box for all metering. On the earlier OM-2N MD model series the dynamic metering was accomplished via two silicon blue cells mounted just behind the lens mount which were aimed at the first curtain/film surface. The meter needle for the viewfinder was driven by another pair of CdS cells mounted in the prism.

The OM-2S used the same metering cell for all operations and light for the preview reading was sent to the cell via a secondary mirror mounted behind the semi-opaque main mirror as in the OM-3 and OM-4 models.

The self-timer on the OM-2S was electronic. On activation, the mirror would lock-up until exposure. If cancelled at any point the shutter would complete the exposure. The self-timer switch, placed where the previous-generation models had a mechanical self-timer arm, permitted the battery check/self-timer beep to be silenced.

A button to the right of the prism provided a 16-second illumination of the LCD metering display in the viewfinder for use in dark conditions.

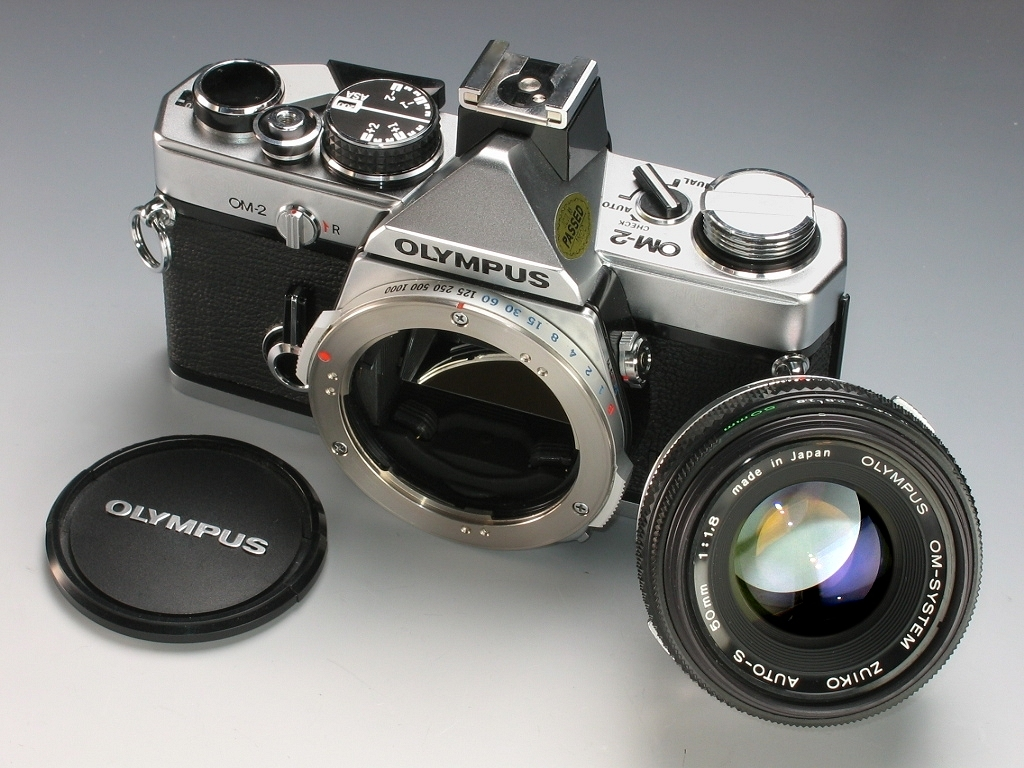
Olympus OM-2 with Zuiko 50mm f1.8 lens

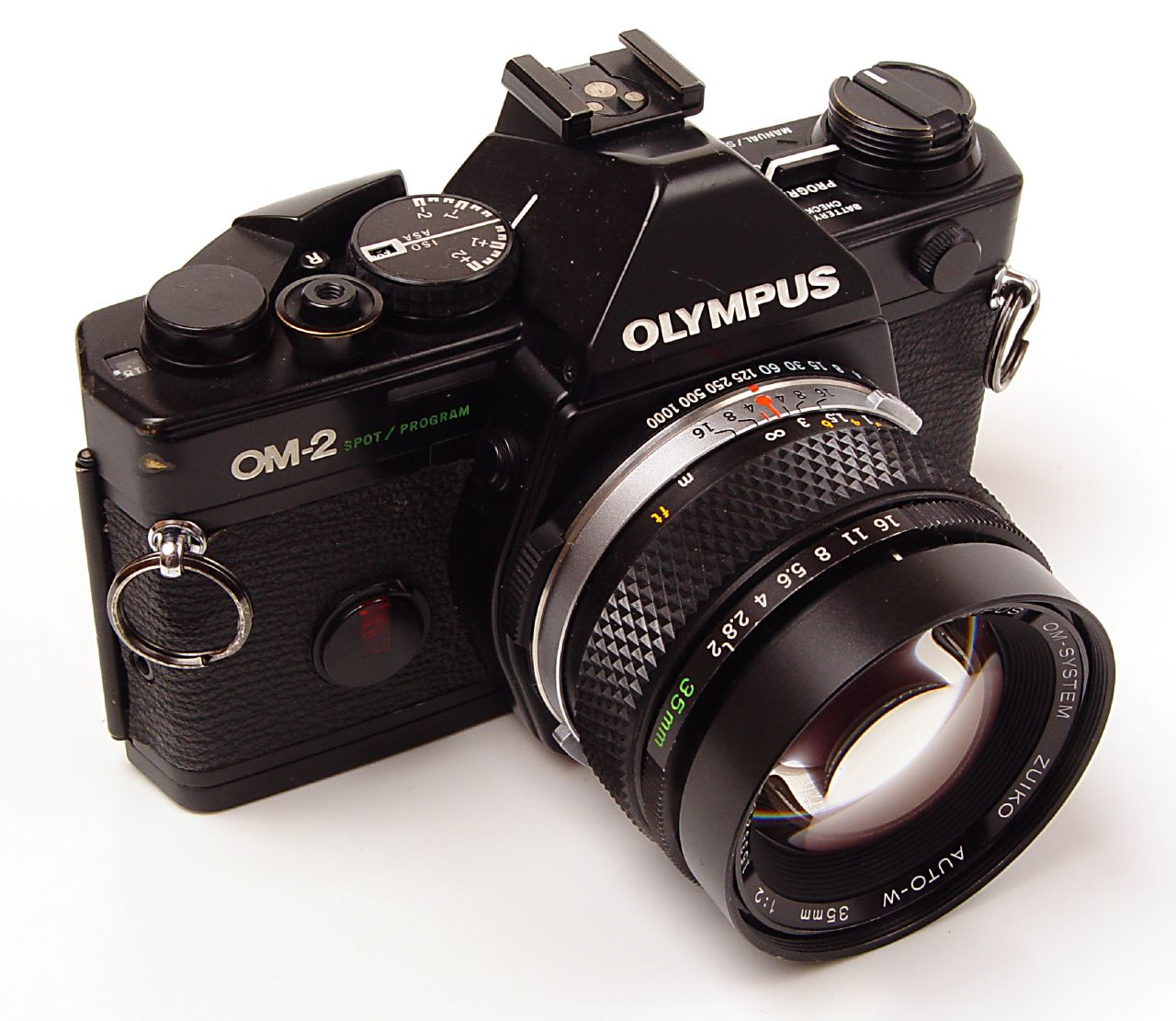
Olympus OM-2SP

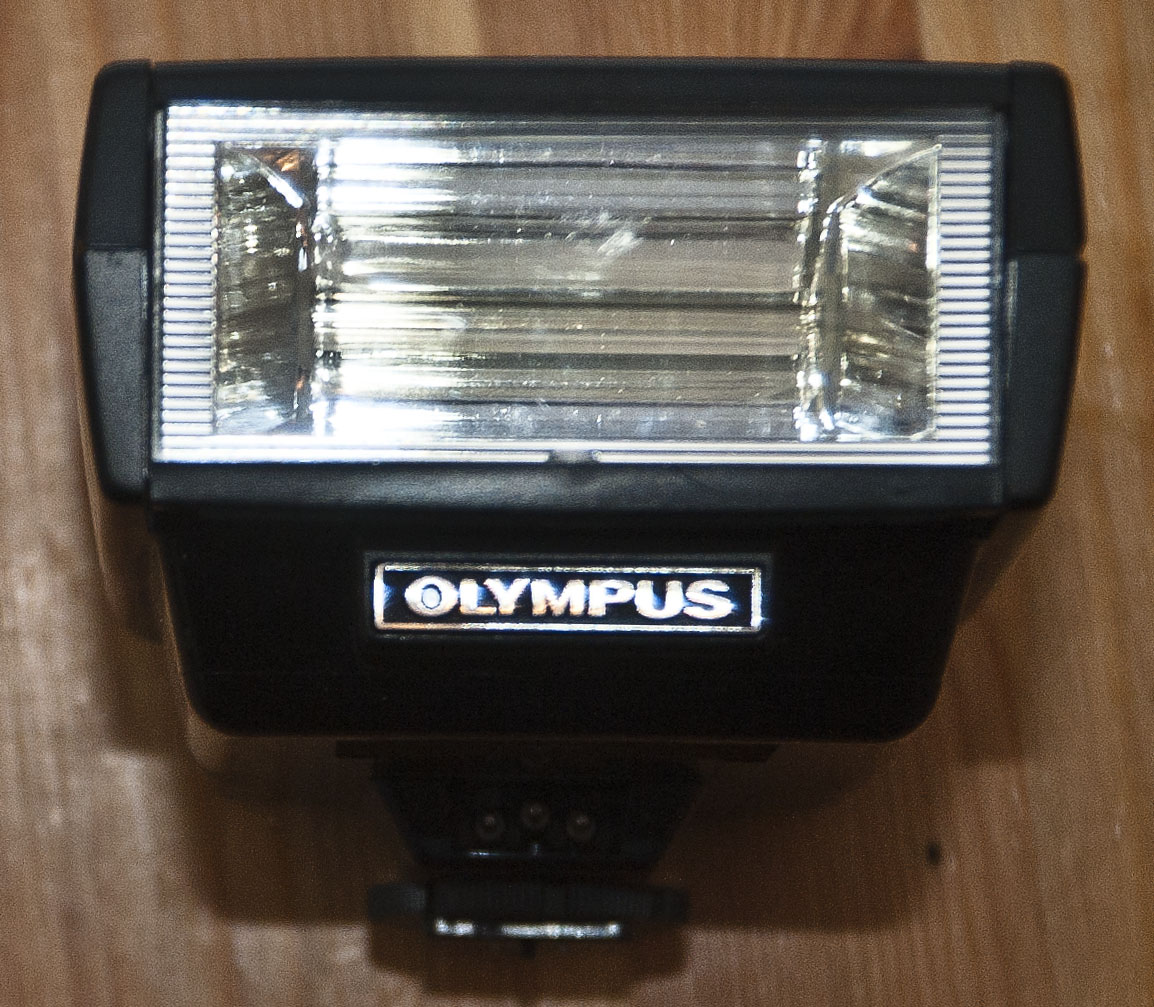
Dedicated TTL strobe T-32 for Olympus OM-2

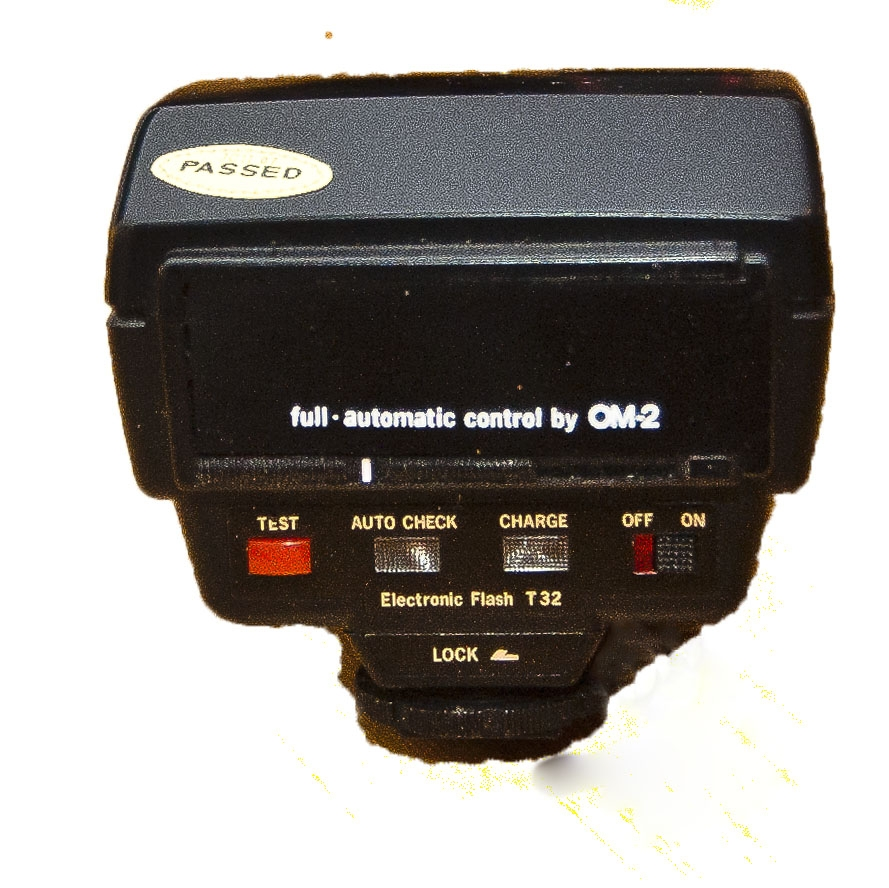
T-32
