= Olympus OM-10 =

35mm single-lens reflex camera

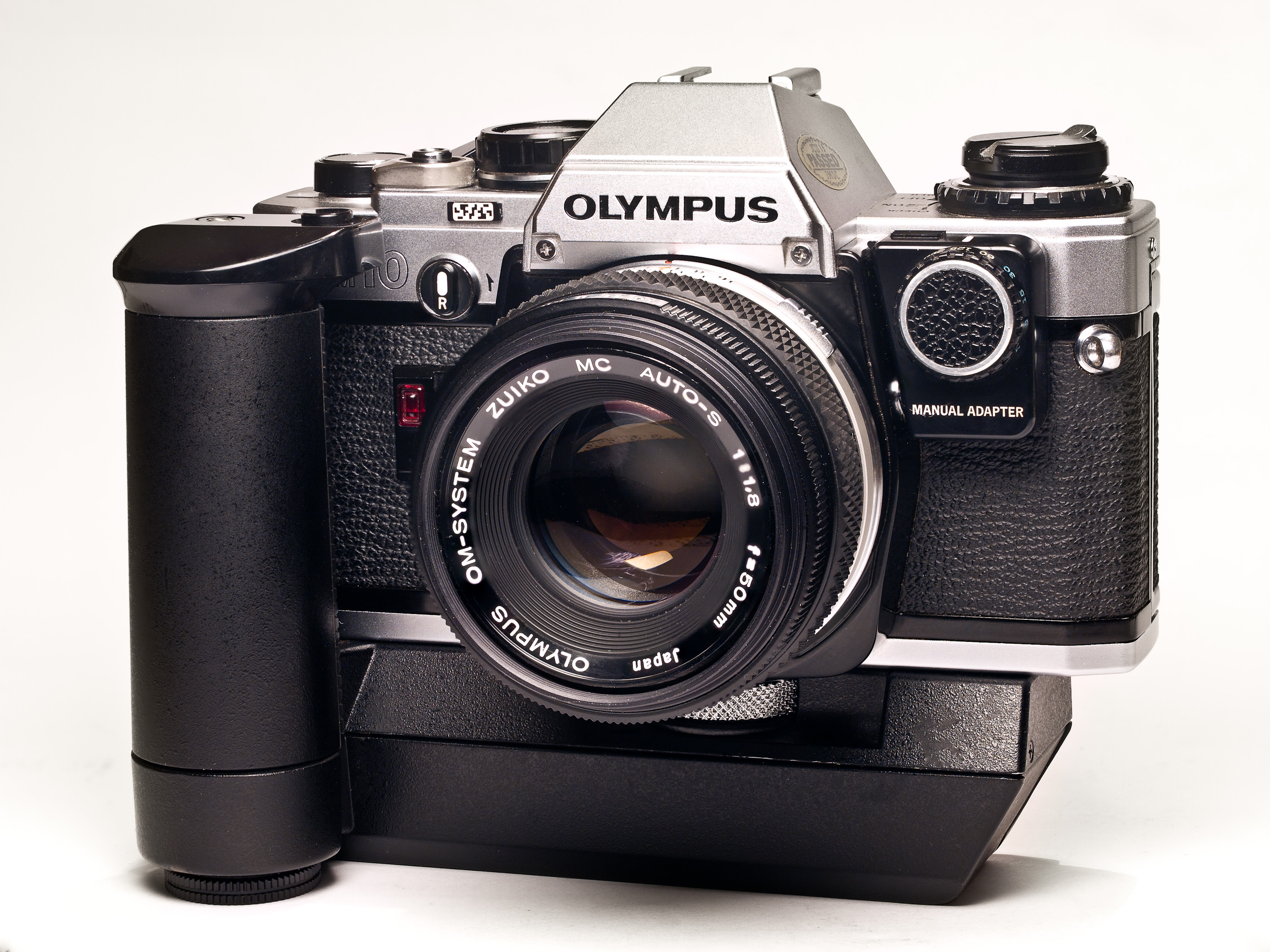
- Olympus OM-10 with winder and manual adapter

Overview
- Maker: Olympus Optical Co., Ltd
- Type: SLR
- Released: 1979
- Production: 1979-1987

Lens
- Lens mount: Olympus OM mount

General
- Dimensions: 136×83×50 mm (5.4×3.3×2.0 in)
- Weight: 430g (15.17 oz)

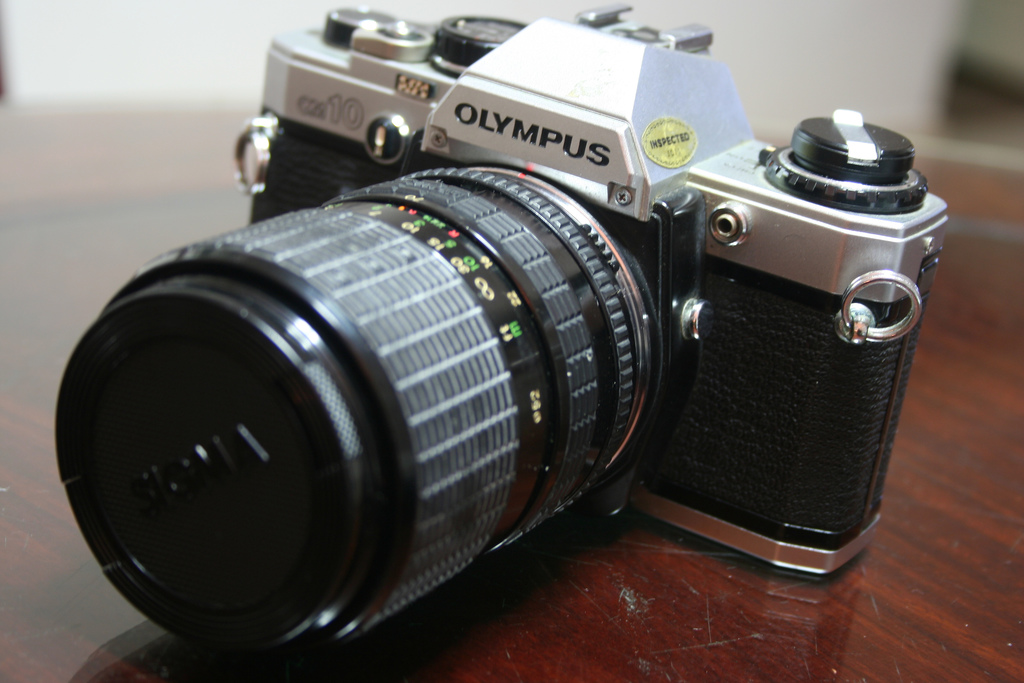
An Olympus OM-10 with a Sigma-brand lens

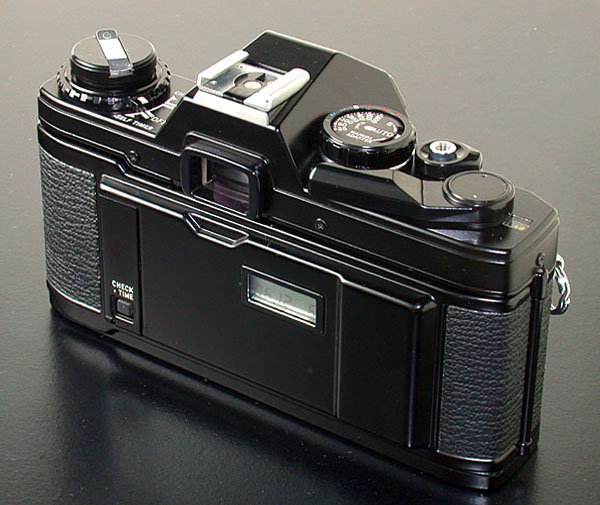
Olympus OM-10 Quartz (with fixed data back)

The Olympus OM-10 is a 35mm single-lens reflex camera, part of the Olympus OM system, manufactured by Olympus Optical Co., Ltd., later Olympus Corporation, in Japan between 1979 and 1987.

== Specifications ==
- Model: SLR camera automatic exposure control electronic shutter type 35mm focal-plane
- Size: 136 x 83 x 50 mm
- Screen size: 24 x 36 mm
- Weight: 430g (15.17 oz)
- Sensitivity range: ISO25-ISO1600
- Mount: Olympus OM mount
- Winding film: lever
- Rewind film formula: crank
- Shutter: Electronically controlled focal-plane
- Shutter speed: B, 1-1/1000 seconds
