= Olympus OM-3 =

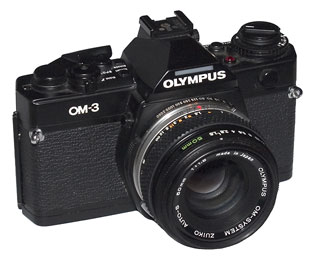
- Black Olympus OM-3

Overview
- Maker: Olympus
- Type: SLR
- Released: 1983 OM-3; 1995 OM-3Ti
- Production: 1983-1986 OM-3; 1995-2002 OM-3Ti

Lens
- Lens mount: Olympus OM mount

Sensor/medium
- Recording medium: 135 film

Focusing
- Focus: Manual focus

Exposure/metering
- Exposure: Manual

Flash
- Flash: Hot shoe

Shutter
- Frame rate: manually wound
- Shutter speed range: 1 s – 1/2000 s; Bulb

General
- Dimensions: 136×84×50 mm (5.4×3.3×2.0 in)
- Weight: 540 g (19 oz) (OM-3); 510 g (18 oz) (OM-3Ti)
- Made in: Japan

Chronology
- Successor: Olympus OM-4

The Olympus OM-3 is a professional single-lens reflex (SLR) film system camera, part of the Olympus OM system. It was manufactured by Olympus Optical Co., Ltd., later Olympus Corporation, in Japan between 1983 and 2002.

== History ==
The Olympus OM-3 is a manual camera without automatic exposure modes, and an entirely mechanical shutter. Introduced in 1983, the OM-3 was the first of a new series of professional camera bodies designed to update the OM-1 and OM-2. These new bodies, which continued with the more popular OM-4, included a number of refinements over their predecessors. The most significant changes made were to the metering system. The OM-3 and OM-4 featured multi-spot metering in addition to the centre-weighted metering on the earlier bodies. This allowed the user to take a number of spot meter readings, all of which were used by the camera to calculate the correct exposure. The system also featured "highlight" and "shadow" buttons which allowed the photographer to identify parts of a scene that should be exposed as white or black respectively. The metering system used a liquid crystal display in place of the older match needle design of the OM-1 and OM-2.

Other refinements were also present, including a faster maximum shutter speed of 1/2000 second and a built in flash hot shoe.

The OM-3 is sold in smaller quantities than its electronic sister, the OM-4. This may be because the OM-1n remained in production and offered an alternative mechanical body for the OM system at a fraction of the price, albeit with less sophisticated metering. After a relatively short production run, the OM-3 was discontinued in 1986. As a result, OM-3 bodies today are much rarer than OM-4s, and those in good condition are highly sought after by collectors.

In 1995, the OM-3Ti was released, an improvement of the OM-3, which was in production until 2002.
