= Olympus OM-1 =

35 mm film single-lens reflex camera

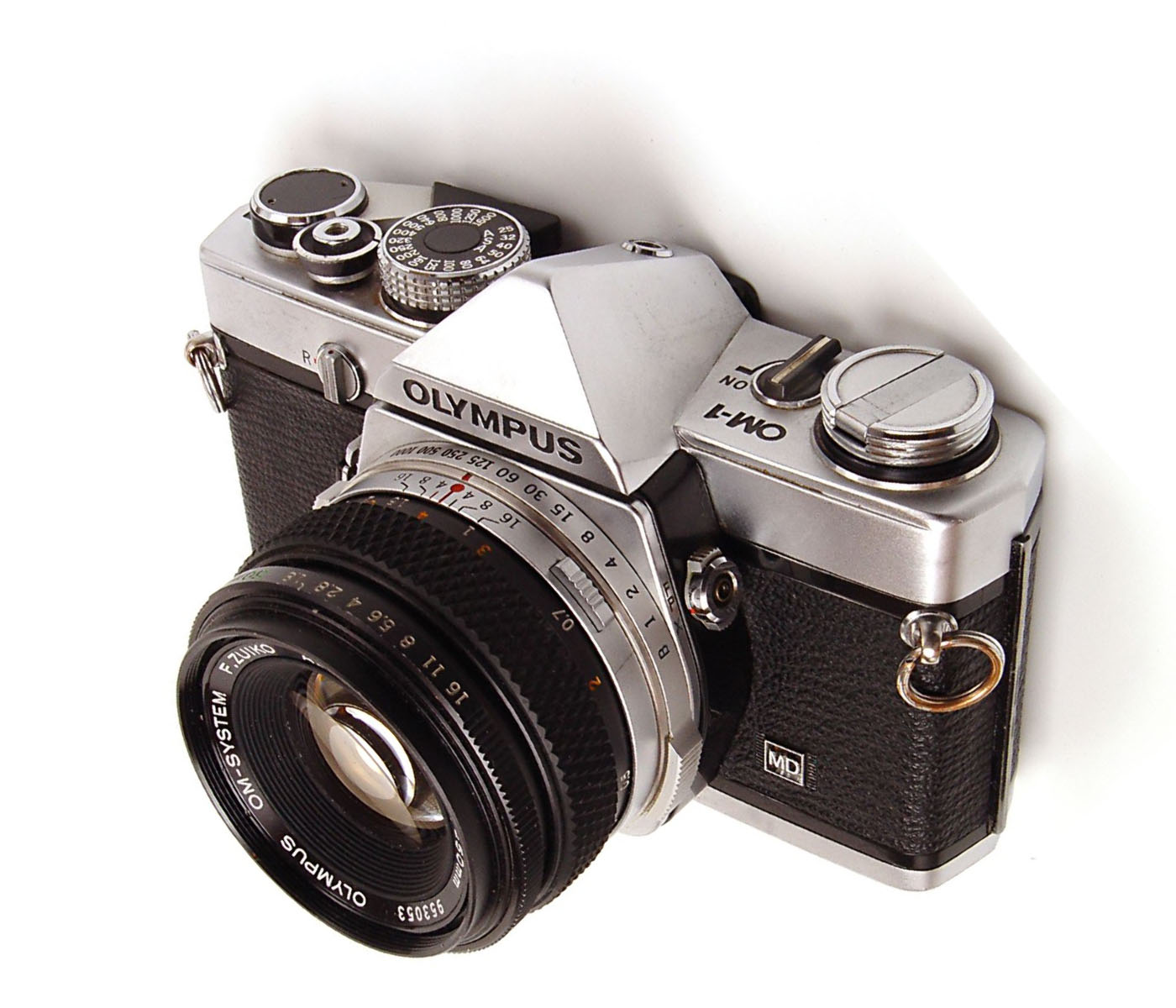
- OM-1MD with 50 mm f/1.8 lens

Overview
- Maker: Olympus
- Type: SLR
- Released: 1972 M-1; 1973 OM-1; 1974 OM-1MD; 1979 OM-1n.
- Production: 1972-1988

Lens
- Lens mount: Olympus OM mount

Sensor/medium
- Recording medium: 135 film

Focusing
- Focus: Manual focus

Exposure/metering
- Exposure: Manual

Flash
- Flash: Hot shoe

Shutter
- Frame rate: manually wound
- Shutter speed range: 1 s – 1/1000 s; Bulb

General
- Dimensions: 136×83×50 mm (5.4×3.3×2.0 in)
- Weight: 490 g (17 oz) (OM-1); 510 g (18 oz) (OM-1n)
- Made in: Japan

Chronology
- Successor: Olympus OM-3

The Olympus OM-1 is a manually operated 35mm single-lens reflex (SLR) professional camera, part of the Olympus OM system. It was manufactured by Olympus Optical Co., Ltd., later Olympus Corporation, in Japan between 1972 and 1988.

== History ==
The first model was presented at photokina in Cologne in 1972 and was called the Olympus M-1. Thirteen years earlier, the release of the Nikon F had made the 35 mm SLR the standard choice for professionals accustomed to Leica and other rangefinders, but it had driven the market towards heavy and bulky cameras. The Olympus M-1 changed this and with it began a reduction of size, weight and noise of the 35 mm SLRs. It was designed by a team led by Yoshihisa Maitani, who had already created the Pen and Pen F cameras, noted for their compactness.

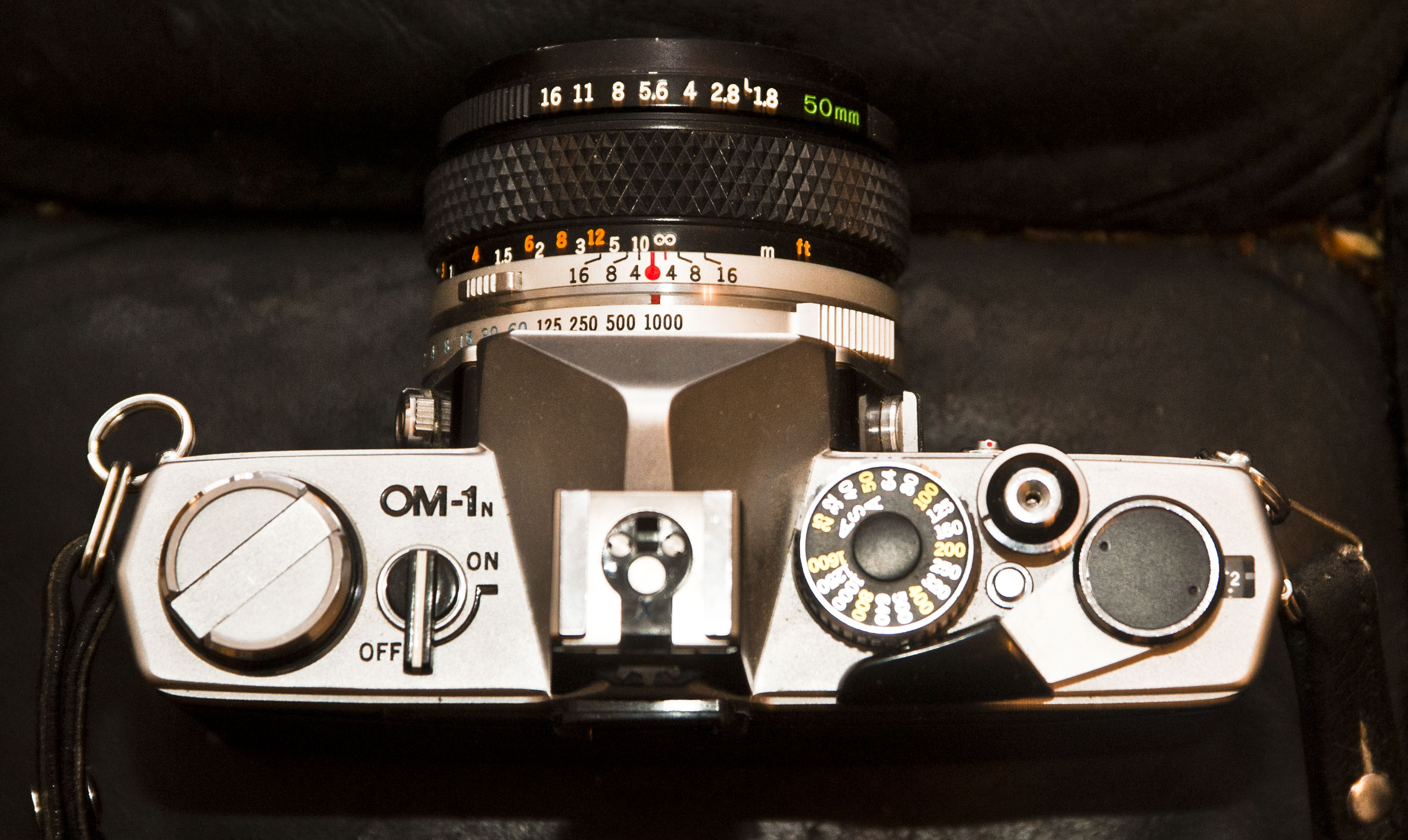
Olympus OM-1n with 50 mm f/1.8 lens

Since Leica's flagship rangefinder cameras are known as the M Series, Leica complained about the name of the M-1, forcing Olympus to rename it as the OM-1 to further clarify between the brands. Because of this, today bodies and lenses with the original M name are rare (52000 bodies were made according to Olympus) and sought after by collectors.

The OM-1 is an all-mechanical SLR. It has a large viewfinder with interchangeable screens but a fixed prism. It also has a through-the-lens exposure meter controlling a needle visible in the viewfinder. It has a compact body, essentially retained on later models. The shutter speed dial is located around the lens mount, which allows photographers to keep the camera at the eye between shots more easily than SLRs with the dial located on the top plate.

Originally, the bottom plate needed to be modified to mount a motor drive on the OM-1. In 1974, Olympus launched the OM-1MD (MD standing for Motor Drive), to which a motor drive can be attached without need for modification. This new version has a small plate marked 'MD' on the front, and a small slot with a circular cover on the underside that covers the motor drive coupling.

In 1979, the next iteration was the OM-1n. It was similar to the OM-1MD, with a redesigned film advance lever, a flash ready/sufficient flash LED in the viewfinder, and automatic flash synchronization (X-sync), regardless of the position of the FP/X switch when used with a T-series flash unit mounted on Flash Shoe 4.

Professional photographers who used the OM-1 include Patrick Lichfield, Jane Bown, David Bailey, Josef Koudelka, Chris Bonington, Tish Murtha, W. Eugene Smith and Kate Garner.
