= Olympus mju =

Digital camera model

The Olympus mju (Greek letter μ[mju:], Olympus Stylus in North America) is a series of compact film and digital cameras manufactured by Olympus.

== Models ==
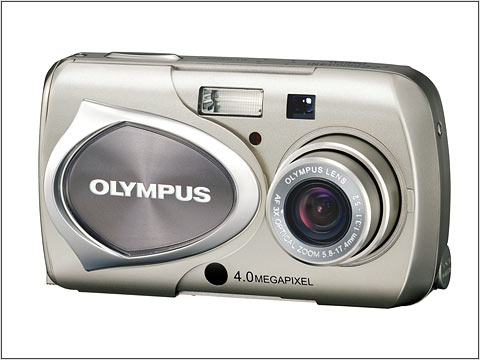
Olympus μ 410

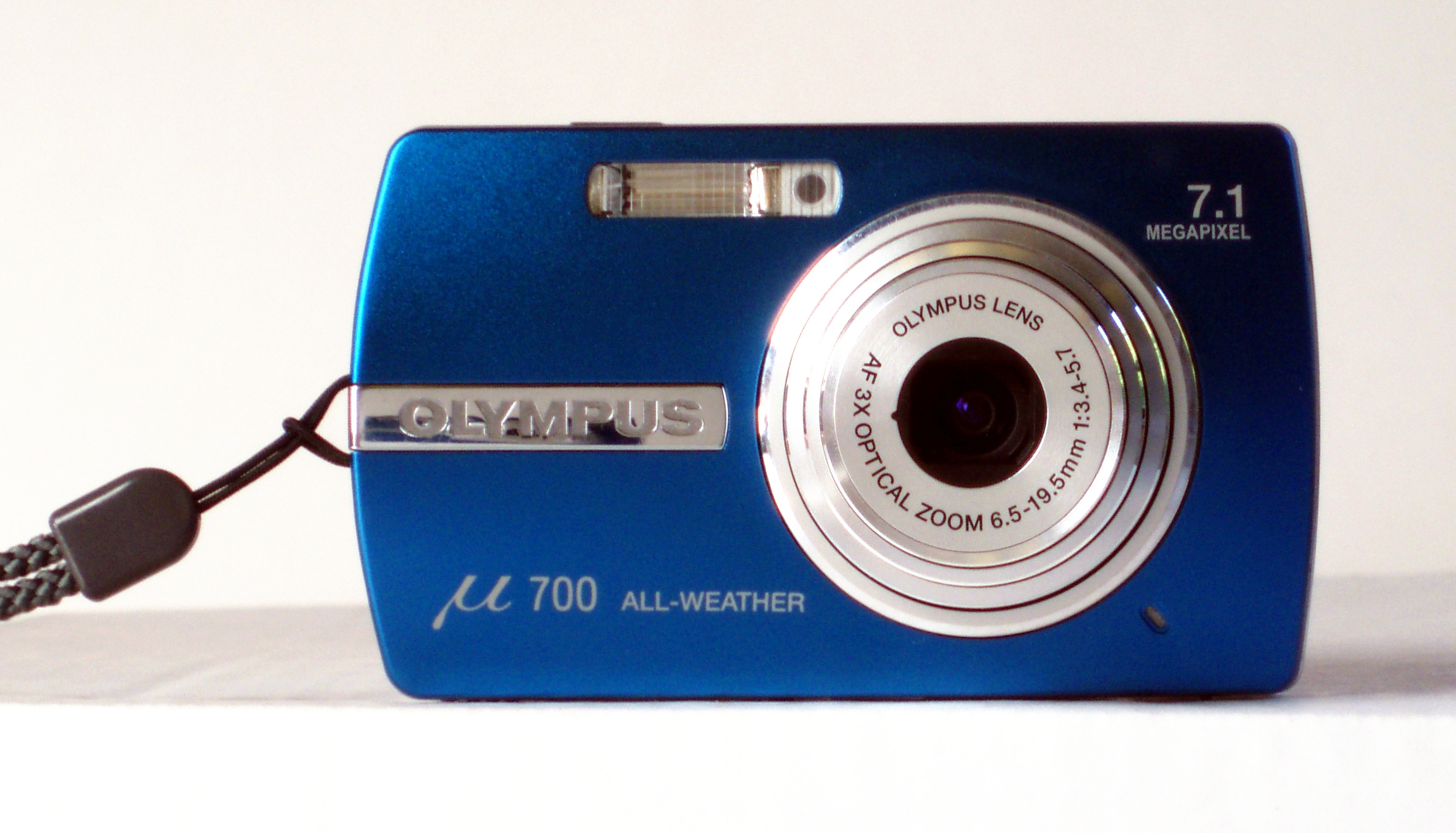
Olympus μ 700

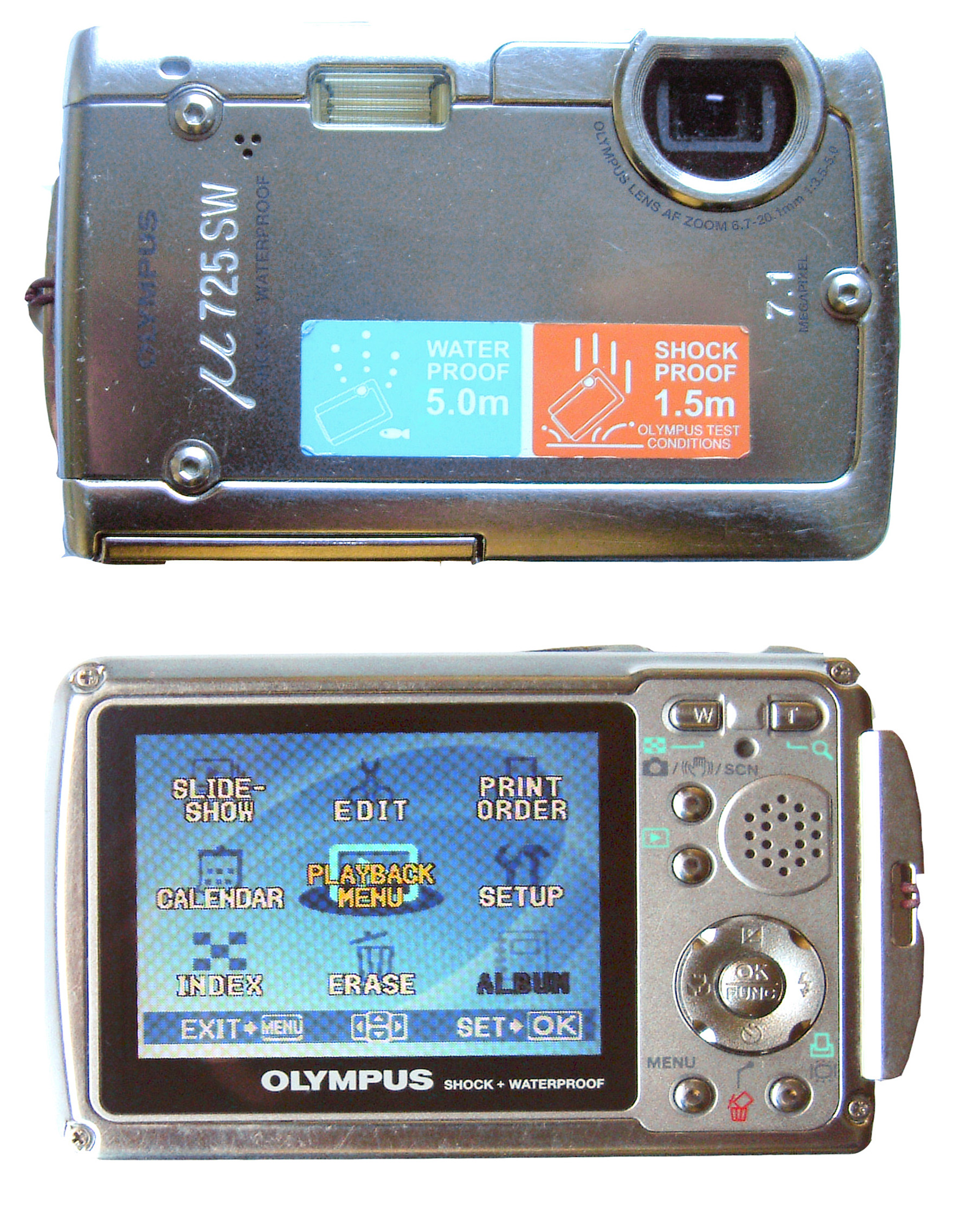
Olympus μ 725 SW

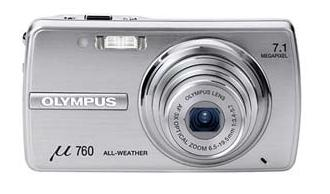
Olympus μ 760

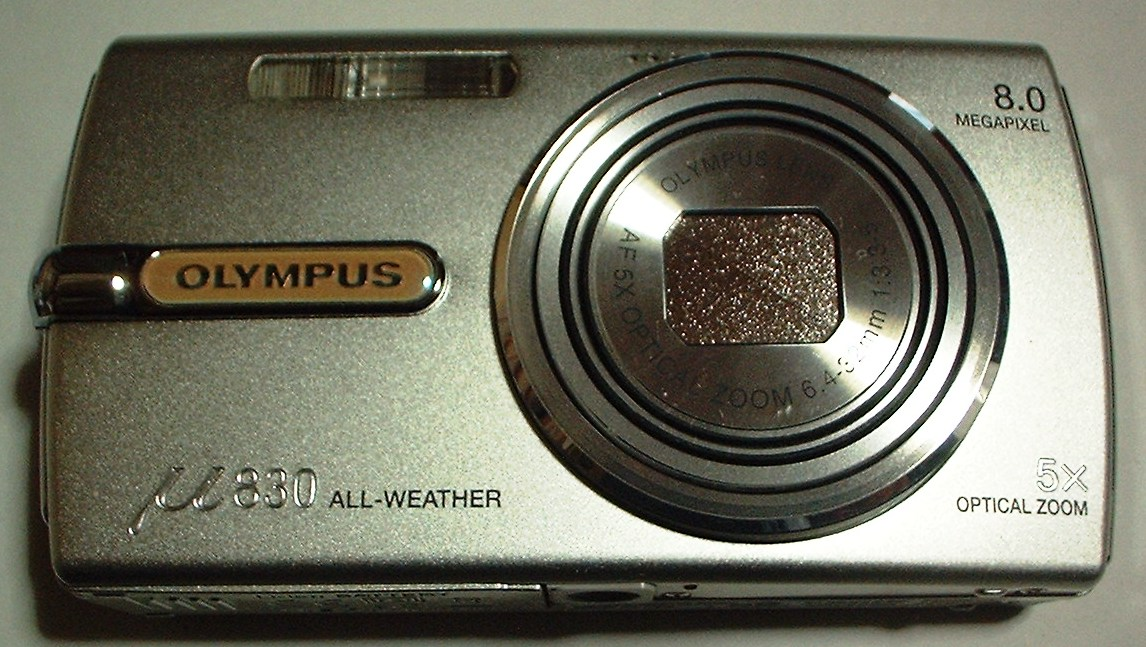
Olympus μ 830

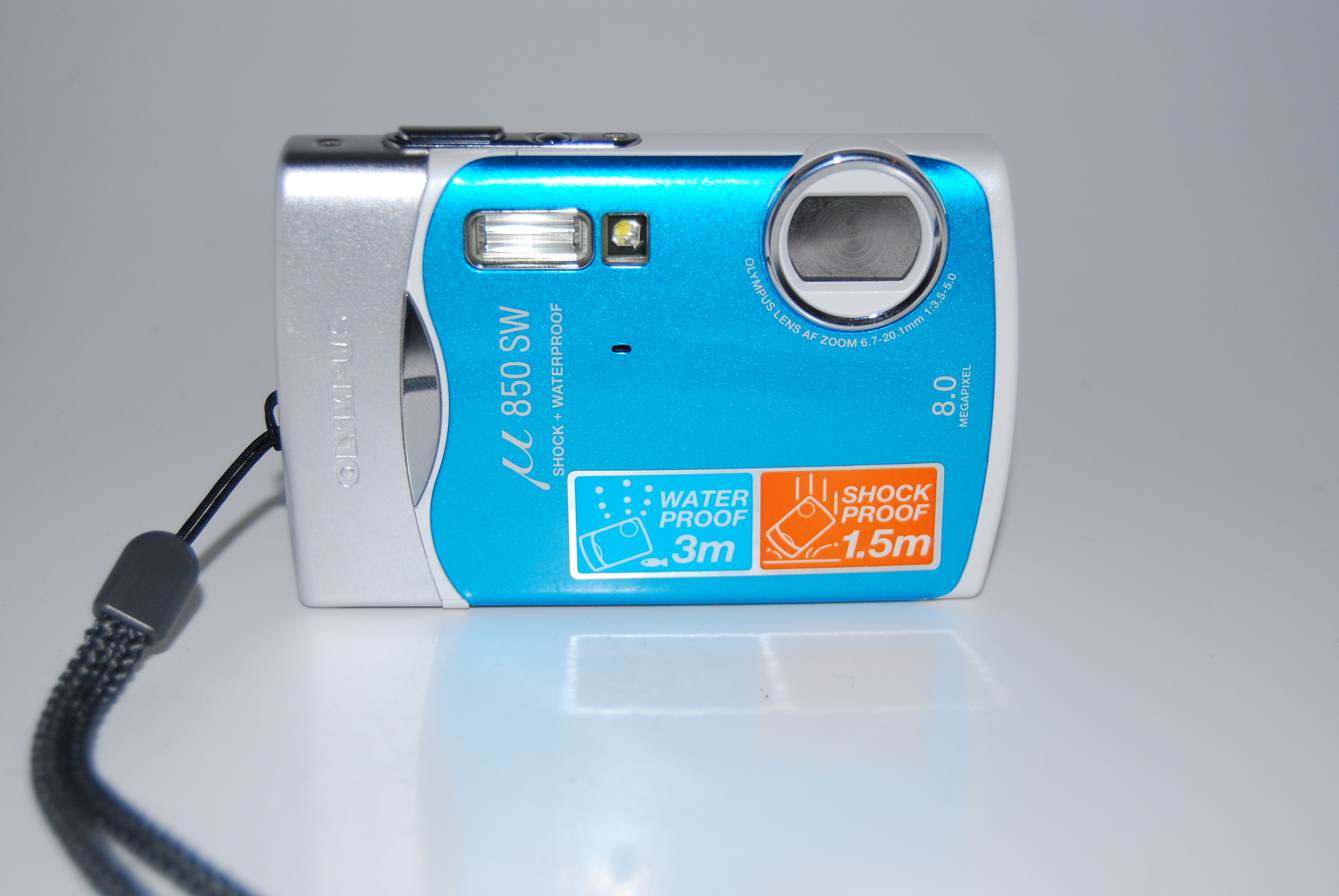
Olympus μ 850 SW

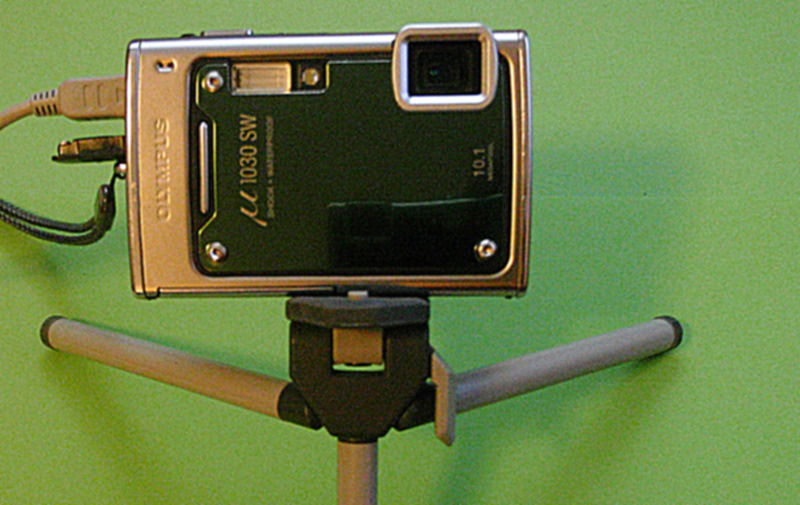
Olympus μ 1030 SW

=== Digital (MetaData for Camera Model is listed after U.S. model nomenclature) ===
- Olympus mju 300 (Stylus 300, 3.2 megapixels)
- Olympus mju 400 (Stylus 400, 4.0 megapixels) also known as μ-30 DIGITAL (from 2004)
- Olympus mju 410 (Stylus 410, 4.0 megapixels)
- Olympus mju 500 (Stylus 500, 5.0 megapixels)
- Olympus mju 600 (Stylus 600, 6.0 megapixels)
- Olympus mju 710 (Stylus 710, 7.1 megapixels)
- Olympus mju 720 SW (Stylus 720 SW, 7.1 megapixels) u720SW,S720SW
- Olympus mju 725 (Stylus 725, 7.1 megapixels) New Model as of Oct 2006
- Olympus mju 730 (Stylus 730, 7.1 megapixels)
- Olympus mju 740 (Stylus 740, 7.1 megapixels)
- Olympus mju 750 (Stylus 750, 7.1 megapixels)
- Olympus mju 800 (Stylus 800, 8.0 megapixels)
- Olympus mju 810 (Stylus 810, 8.0 megapixels)
- Olympus mju 1000 (Stylus 1000, 10.0 megapixels)
- Olympus mju 1010 (Stylus 1010, 10.1 megapixels)
- Olympus mju 1020 (Stylus 1020, 10.1 megapixels)
- Olympus mju 1030 SW (Stylus 1030 SW, 10.1 megapixels) (Olympus μ 1030 SW)
- Olympus mju 1040 (Stylus 1040, 10.1 megapixels)
- Olympus mju 1200 (Stylus 1200, 12.0 megapixels)

=== Film ===
- Olympus mju, (Stylus in North America), 1991
- Olympus mju Stylus QD (in North America)
- Olympus mju Zoom 105 (Stylus Zoom 105), 1996
- Olympus mju II, (Stylus Epic), 1997
- Olympus mju Zoom 115 QD (Stylus Epic Zoom 115 QD, 1997)
- Olympus mju II Zoom (Stylus Epic Zoom 80), 1998
- Olympus mju Zoom 140 (Stylus Zoom 140, 1998)
- Olympus mju Zoom Wide 80 (Stylus Zoom Wide 80)
- Olympus mju Zoom 105 (Stylus Zoom 105)
- Olympus mju III Wide 100 (Stylus 100 Wide)
- Olympus mju III 120 (Stylus III 120)
- Olympus mju III 150 (Stylus III 150)
- Olympus mju II 170VF (Stylus Epic Zoom 170 QD)
- Olympus mju Zoom 105 (Stylus Select 105)
