= Consumer Electronics Show =

US trade show

CES

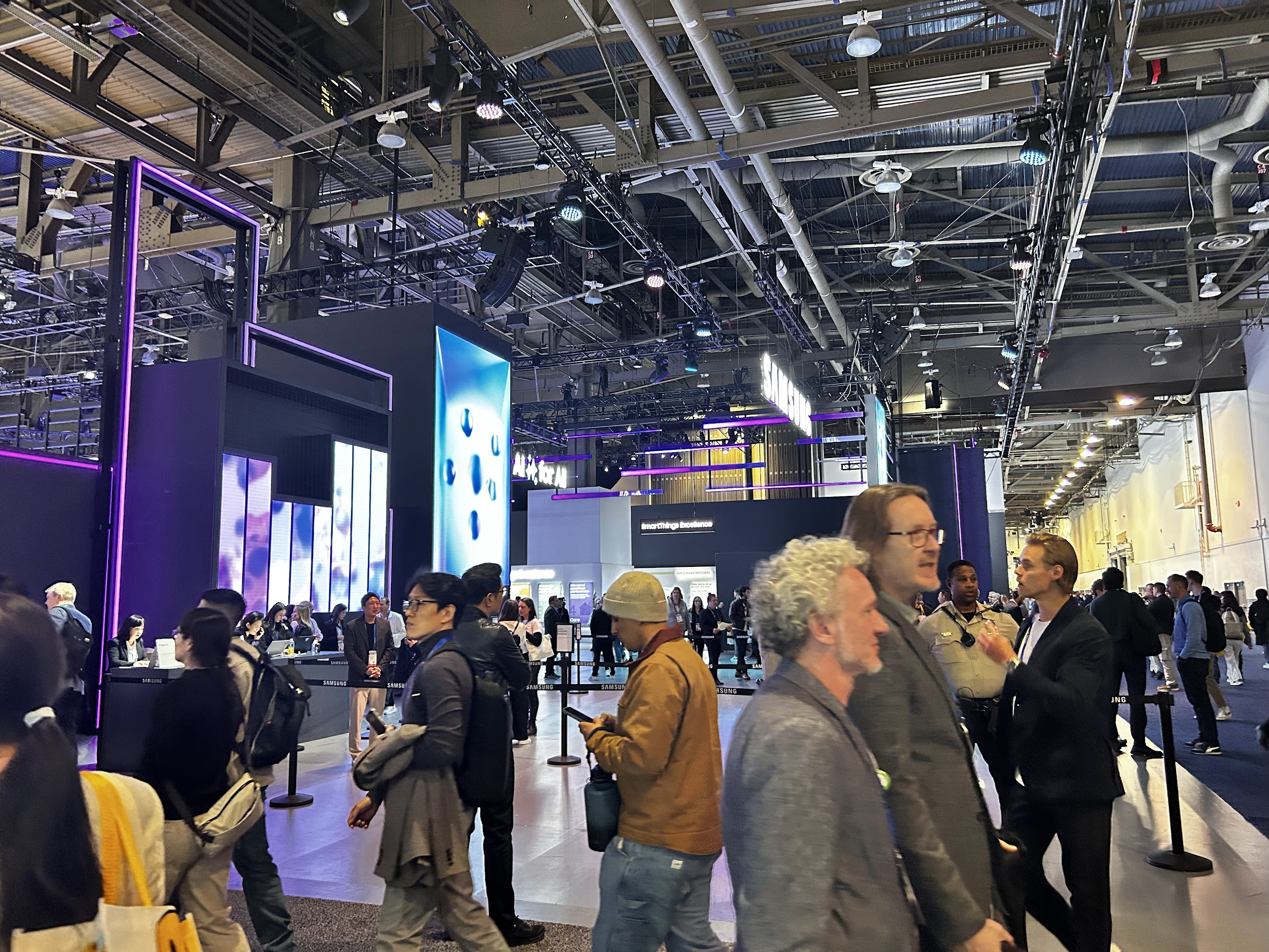
- Attendees at CES 2025
- Status: Active
- Genre: Consumer electronics
- Frequency: Annually
- Venue: Las Vegas Convention Center
- Locations: Paradise, Nevada, U.S.
- Country: United States
- Inaugurated: June 24, 1967 (59 years ago)
- Most recent: January 6, 2026 (10 months ago)
- Next event: January 5, 2027 (43 days' time)
- Attendance: 141,000 (2025)
- Organizer: Consumer Technology Association
- Website: ces.tech

CES (formerly an acronym for Consumer Electronics Show) is an annual trade show organized by the Consumer Technology Association (CTA). Typically held in the first Tuesday of January at the Las Vegas Convention Center in Paradise, Nevada, United States, the event typically hosts presentations of new products and technologies in the consumer electronics industry.

== History ==
The CES logo used from 2000–2024

The first CES was held in June 1967 in New York City. It was a spin-off of the Chicago Music Show which, until then, had served as the main event for exhibiting consumer electronics. The event had 17,500 attendees and over 100 exhibitors. The kickoff speaker was Motorola chairman Bob Galvin. From 1978 to 1994, CES was held twice each year: once in January in Las Vegas as the Winter Consumer Electronics Show (WCES) and once in June in Chicago as the Summer Consumer Electronics Show (SCES).

The winter show was held in Las Vegas in 1995 as planned. However, since the summer Chicago shows were beginning to lose popularity, the organizers decided to experiment by having the show travel around to different cities starting in 1995 with a planned show in Philadelphia at the Pennsylvania Convention Center. However, the inaugural E3 gaming show was scheduled to be held on the West Coast in May and proved a source of increasing competition, causing the Philadelphia Summer CES show to be cancelled. The 1996 Winter show was again held in Las Vegas in January, followed by a Summer show this time in Orlando, Florida; however, only a fraction of the traditional exhibitors participated. The next "Summer" show was scheduled to be held in conjunction with Spring COMDEX in Atlanta; however, when only two dozen-or-so exhibitors signed on, the CES portion of the show was cancelled. In 1998, the show changed to a once-a-year format, with Las Vegas as the location. In Las Vegas, the show is one of the largest (the other being CONEXPO-CON/AGG), taking up to 18 days to set up, run and break down.

== Show highlights ==
=== 1960s ===
==== 1967 ====
The first CES was held in New York City from June 24 to 28, 1967. The 200 exhibitors attracted 17,500 attendees to the Hilton and Americana hotels over those four days. Also displayed were pocket radios and TVs with integrated circuits.

=== 1970s ===
==== 1970 ====
At the 1970 CES, Philips unveiled the first-ever home VCR, the N1500 videocassette recorder. Until that point, VCRs cost upward of $50,000 (equivalent to $410,000 in 2025) and were used mainly by TV stations, but the Philips model with a built-in tuner was just $900 (equivalent to $7,000 in 2025).

==== 1976 ====
The 1976 Winter CES was held January 7–9 in Chicago at the Conrad Hilton Hotel. Per the show guide, it included video (with television receivers and video systems panels), audio (including CB radio, radio, audio compacts, audio components, and tape equipment panels), and calculator and watch areas (considered separate component conferences). Speakers included the FTC's Joan Bernstein on "The Warranty Law – Its Status and Impact", and the FCC's Richard M. Smith on "Regulating Citizens' Band Radios".

The 1976 Summer CES was also held June 13–16 in Chicago at McCormick Place.

==== 1977 ====
The Atari VCS was shown publicly for the first time at the 1977 CES.

==== 1979 ====
The 1979 Winter CES was held in January in Las Vegas. Atari 400 and 800 computers were introduced. Bill Gates appeared at CES for the first time, introducing the first BASIC compiler for the Apple II. Texas Instruments showed off the TI-99/4.

The 1979 Summer CES was held June 3–6 in Chicago at McCormick Place. Features (per the show guide) included personal communications, retail advertising, promotion and store layout, exports, video, audio, auto sound/telephone sales, and a large series of retail sales and sales management breakouts.

=== 1980s ===
==== 1981 ====
At the 1981 CES, Philips and Sony introduced the CD player, which they had developed together.

==== 1982 ====
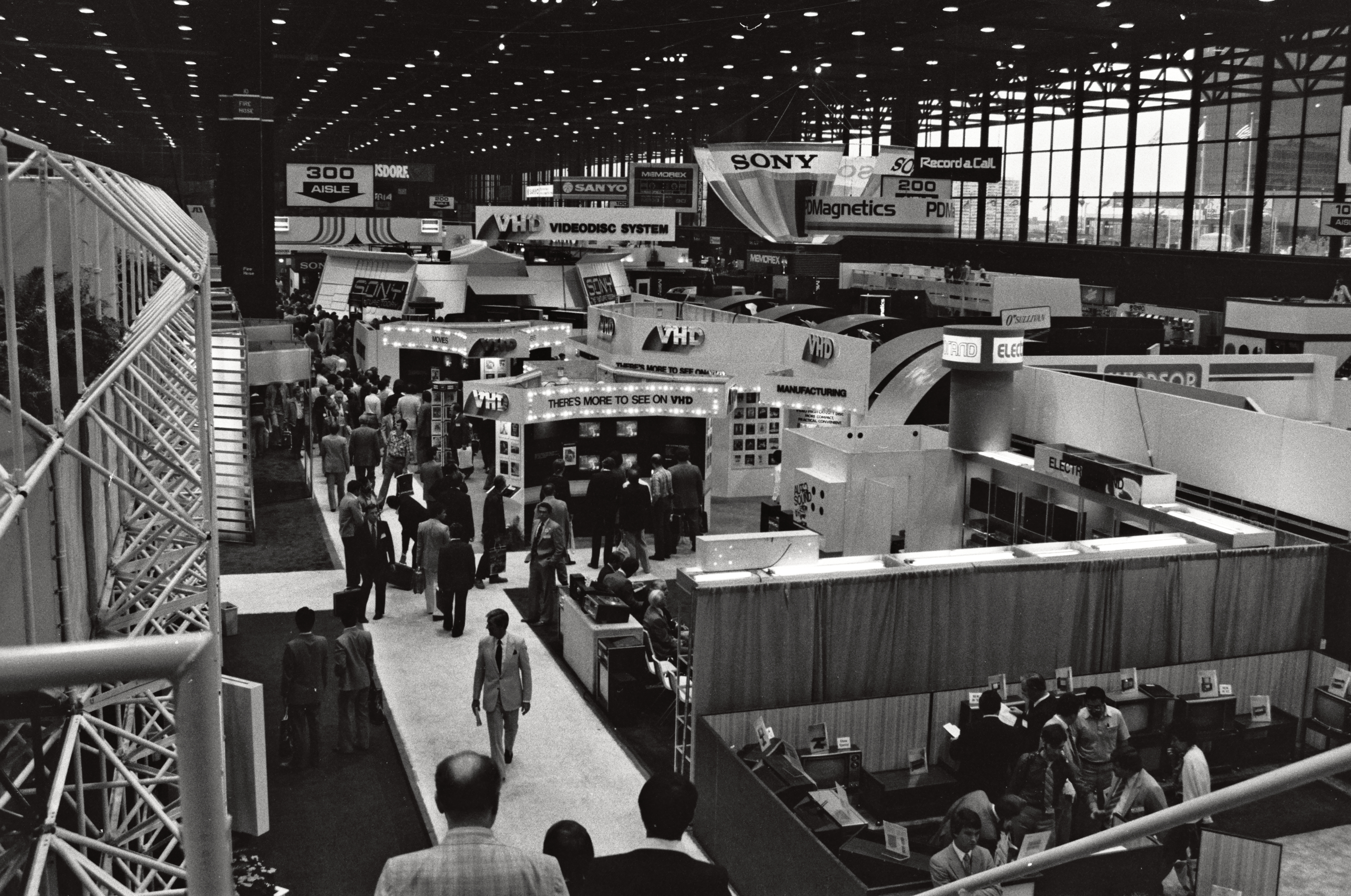
The showfloor at the 1982 Summer CES at McCormick Place in Chicago

The 1982 Summer CES in Chicago at McCormick Place saw the first appearance of the Commodore 64 and General Consumer Electronics' Vectrex.

==== 1983 ====
In 1983, Summer CES returned to McCormick Place in Chicago and featured the introduction of the Coleco Adam and the Atari 600XL.

==== 1984 ====
The Amiga was first shown publicly at the 1984 Summer CES. In addition, Japanese jazz fusion artist Ryo Kawasaki performed with the Commodore 64 as a demo for the Kawasaki Synthesizer.

==== 1985 ====
At the 1985 Summer CES, Nintendo unveiled the Nintendo Entertainment System (NES), the American version of its Famicom, with a new case redesigned by Lance Barr and featuring a "zero insertion force" cartridge slot.

==== 1988 ====
The video game Tetris was first shown publicly in the U.S. at the 1988 Summer CES.

=== 1990s ===
==== 1990 ====
The game John Madden Football was unveiled at the 1991 CES.

==== 1991 ====
Winter CES saw unveiling of Game Gear. The attendance number was 73,533.

In Summer CES, Sony revealed a Super Famicom with a built-in CD-ROM drive, that incorporated Green Book technology or CD-i, called "Play Station" (also known as SNES-CD). However, a day after the announcement at CES, Nintendo announced that it would be breaking its partnership with Sony, opting to go with Philips instead while using the same technology. Games for NEC's TurboGrafx-16, Sega Genesis, and SNK's Neo-Geo took center stage.

==== 1992 ====
Winter CES was held in Las Vegas. A major video game of the show was Street Fighter II on the SNES. In the Summer CES held in Chicago and dominated by video game products, Apple Inc. unveiled its Newton MessagePad. First recorders introduced for the two rival digital systems targeted as replacements for the Philips Compact Cassette analog audio tape system: MiniDisc created by Sony and Digital Compact Cassette (DCC), created by Philips and Matsushita. The attendance number was 79,094.

==== 1993 ====
In a one-time experiment, the 1993 Summer CES was open to the general public.

Major announcements during this edition were:

- Capcom unveils Mega Man X for the first time in North America. 3DO Interactive Multiplayer was announced. The MiniDisc was announced as well.

==== 1994 ====
AT&T displayed prototype AT&T 3DO units at the Winter CES.

==== 1998 ====
The 1999 CES was dominated by players for the burgeoning DVD format, with a variety of features and price points. The DIVX format was also showcased, but received relatively little attention, and no companies had DIVX players on display.

=== 2000s ===
==== 2001 ====
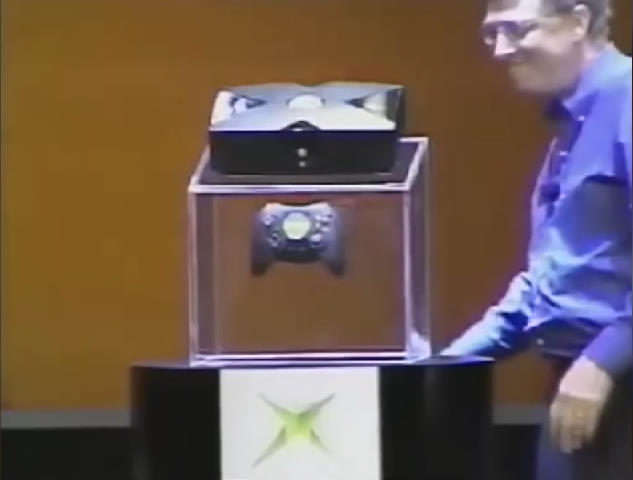
Gates unveiling Xbox

Microsoft founder and chairman Bill Gates officially unveiled the final design of its Xbox console and controller. The Rechargeable Battery Recycling Corporation (RBRC) announced expansion of Charge Up to Recycle! program to include all consumer rechargeable batteries, adding Nickel Metal Hydride (Ni-MH), Lithium Ion (Li-Ion), and Small VRLA (SSLA/Pb).

==== 2002 ====
Microsoft demonstrated a preview version of Windows XP Media Center Edition at CES 2002.

==== 2003 ====
The Memory Stick PRO was introduced as a joint effort between Sony and SanDisk. Adobe announced Adobe Photoshop Album to import, organize and edit digital photos, and allows quick and easy searching and sharing of entire photo collections. Pentax announced the OptioS digital camera. Sony launched its first DVD Handycam Camcorders. Olympus announced weather proof metal body Olympus mju U10D, S300D, u300D and 400 Digital cameras.

==== 2004 ====
The first handheld video players based on Microsoft's Portable Media Player (PMC) were introduced. The media saw this as a challenge against Apple's iPod line, which by that time did not have a portable video player. Creative Technology planned to be the first to introduce a player based on PMC.

Digital video recorders (DVC) were highly prolific during the show of 2004, as well as the HDMI interface.

The Blu-ray Group held the first US press conference at the April 2004 CES to promote the Blu-ray Disc format.

==== 2005 ====
The 2005 CES was from January 6 to 9, 2005, in Las Vegas, Nevada, at the Las Vegas Convention Center. The event started off with a twist when the main keynote address by Microsoft chairman Bill Gates went wrong, as his demonstration of the Xbox 360 resulted in an out of memory error, much to the amusement of the onlookers. Samsung showed off a 102-inch (2.6 m) plasma television.

Zimiti Ltd (renamed Boardbug Ltd in 2007) won the "Best of Innovators" award for Personal Electronics. It is the only British company to have won this award.

==== 2006 ====
The 2006 exhibition took place on January 5–8, 2006, at the Las Vegas Convention Center, the Sands Convention Center, the Alexis Park hotel and the Las Vegas Hilton hotel. HDTV was a central theme in the Bill Gates keynote as well as many of the other manufacturer's speeches. The standards competition between HD DVD and Blu-ray Disc was conspicuous, with some of the first HD movie releases and first HD players being announced at the show. Philips showed a rollable display prototype whose screen can retain an image for several months. Hillcrest Labs won the "Best Of Innovations" award in the video accessories category for software and hardware that allows a television to be controlled with natural gestures. Attendance was over 150,000 individuals in 1.67 million net square feet of space, making it the largest electronics event in the United States.

==== 2007 ====
The 2007 CES exhibition ran from Monday to Thursday on January 8–11, 2007, instead of on a weekend. The venues also changed slightly, with the high-performance audio and home theater expo moving from the Alexis Park venue to The Venetian. The remaining venues were the same as previous years: the Las Vegas Convention Center was the center of events, with the adjacent Las Vegas Hilton, and the Sands Expo and Convention Center hosting satellite exhibitions.

The location for the main keynotes was the other major change for 2007. Previously held at the Las Vegas Hilton's Main Theater, they staged for the first time at The Palazzo Ballroom in The Venetian. Bill Gates gave his ninth pre-show keynote address on the Sunday evening. The opening keynote was presented by Gary Shapiro (President/CEO of the Consumer Electronics Association, which hosts the event), with Ed Zander, Chairman/CEO of Motorola. Other keynote speakers scheduled included Robert Iger from The Walt Disney Company, Michael Dell, founder of Dell Inc., and Leslie Moonves of CBS.

Finally, Industry Insider presentations moved to the Las Vegas Hilton, with contributions from Olli-Pekka Kallasvuo, CEO of Nokia and John Chambers, CEO of Cisco.

In the gaming section for Windows Vista and DirectX 10, there were two games shown: Age of Conan and Crysis.

==== 2008 ====
The 2008 exhibition was from January 7 to 10, 2008, in Las Vegas with 141,150 attendees. Bill Gates gave the keynote speech, in which he formally announced his retirement from his day-to-day duties at Microsoft.

Panasonic attracted much attention by releasing a 150" plasma TV as well as a 50" TV as thin as 0.46 inches (11.6 mm).

==== 2009 ====
The 2009 exhibition, held January 7–10, 2009, returned to the previous Thursday–Sunday schedule, and attracted 113,085 attendees. Among more than 2,700 exhibiting companies were approximately 300 first-time exhibitors.

Several highlights included organic light-emitting diode (OLED) televisions, the Palm Pre, Mattel MindFlex Game, pico projectors, the Marvell SheevaPlug plug computer, and 3D projectors.

The Minoru 3D Webcam, a USB webcam that was billed as the world's first stereoscopic 3D consumer stereo webcam won the "Fans Favorite" award. Dell introduced its Dell Adamo subnotebook.

The game show Jeopardy! filmed one episode from the celebrity series and the 2009 Tournament of Champions on a new set at the Sony booth. The set was moved to their main studio at Sony Pictures Studios in Culver City, California, starting with the show's 26th season through the 29th season.

CES 2009 suffered an attendance drop of at least 22%, which was attributed to the Great Recession.

=== 2010s ===
==== 2010 ====
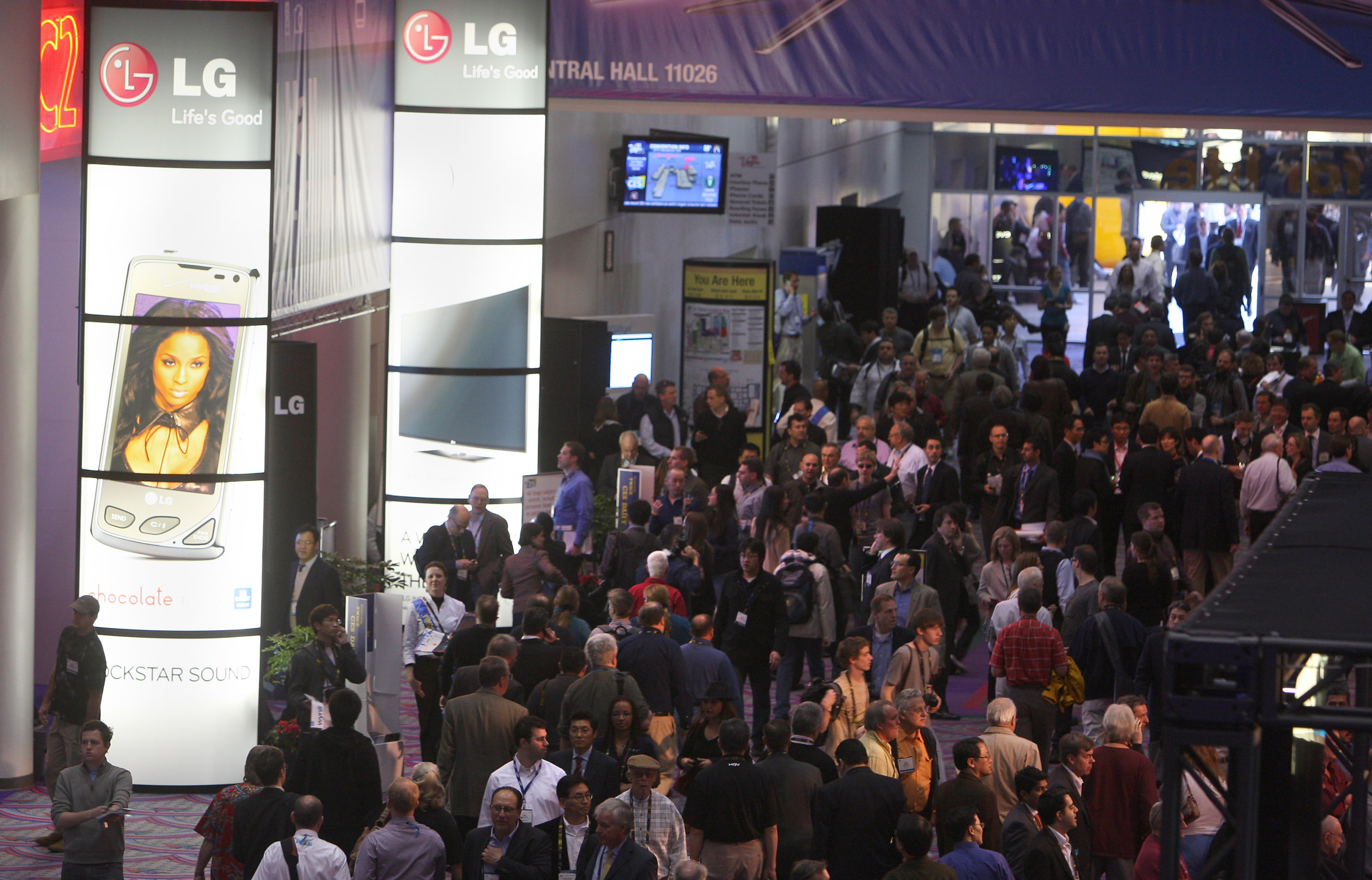
Attendees near the LG Electronics display at CES 2010

The 2010 exhibition was held January 7–10, 2010, and attracted more than 120,000 attendees.

Highlights include the Intel Infoscape, which is run on the Intel Core i7 processor. One computer ran two 7-foot (2.1 m) screens, displaying 576 cubes hooked up to 20,000 information sources, including 20 live video feeds. Visitors would touch one of the cubes, and an infobox displaying that content would come forward. One journalist explained, "The graphics on the giant screens were a tons of fun to move around with their uncanny quickness and smooth motion, and the whole thing felt super responsive, Giving us a peek into the future, it seemed a lot like that computer screen in the movie Minority Report. It was the most spectacular demo we saw at CES 2010." Equally impressive, Parrot presented the first prototype of Parrot AR.Drone, a remote-controlled flying toy which streams video via WiFi to an iPhone.

Sustainable Planet grew by 40% in 2010.

==== 2011 ====
The 2011 exhibition was held from January 6 to 9, 2011. CESWEB is reporting that their pre-audit numbers show an attendance of 128,949.

Many tablets were introduced in 2011's show, such as the Motorola Xoom tablet, winning Best of Show, which runs Android Honeycomb. Many 4G phones were also unveiled at the show, including the LG Revolution, Samsung Infuse 4G, HTC Thunderbolt, Sony Ericsson Xperia Arc, Motorola CLIQ 2, Motorola Droid Bionic, and Motorola Atrix 4G. In a push towards mobile devices, Microsoft demonstrated an early version of the next release of the Windows operating system, running on ARM-based devices.

3D TVs were introduced by many giants, such as Mitsubishi's 92-inch model of its 2011 lineup of theater-sized 3D Home Cinema TVs. Toshiba also unveiled its Glasses Free 4K 3D TV prototype. Samsung announced the Plasma 3D HD TV series named D8000 and LG introduced the LED 3D TV of its Infinia Nano series.

3net, a 3DTV channel co-owned by Discovery Communications, Sony, and IMAX, was previewed.

==== 2012 ====
The 2012 exhibition was held from January 8 to 13, 2012. Microsoft released an official statement saying that CES 2012 will be Microsoft's last appearance at the event. The show organizers claimed that 153,000 people attended the 2012 show, a 2% increase from the previous year and a new all-time attendance record. Intel was caught falsifying a demo of their new Ivy Bridge processors. AMD demonstrated their new Trinity APUs.

AMTC was demonstrating this 'Tier-2' CE products ('middleware') featuring the Inview Technology platform. Inview claimed that its low processing and memory footprint means connected TV capabilities are available at low-cost, as the software is provided royalty free. Parrot presented the "world's most advanced headphones" the Parrot ZIK By Starck.

This was also the first year in which the Photo Marketing Association held its annual trade show in conjunction with CES, with the PMA show branded as PMA@CES.

==== 2013 ====
The 2013 International CES, instead of starting on Thursday went from Tuesday to Friday, January 8–11, 2013, in the Las Vegas Convention Center, Las Vegas, Nevada, United States. Over 3,000 exhibitors showcased a wide range of innovative products this year. CES 2013 was known for what was billed as an insane opening by Qualcomm. This year the categories include 3D, Accessories, Audio, Automotive Electronics, Embedded Technology, Lifestyle Electronics, Wireless & Wireless Devices to name a few. 2013 International CES however was not necessarily being noted for announcing the newest products, but getting a lot of press for the fundamental changes about to hit the digital world; such as motion detection sensors, the driverless cars and digital home safety and technology.

Major announcements during this edition were:

- Samsung unveiled multi-view TVs and Flexible OLED Display Youm
- Sony announced Sony Xperia Z smartphone, and Samsung Announced Galaxy S2 plus smartphone.
- Sony announced TRILUMINOS quantum dot display technology.
- Qualcomm unveils Snapdragon 600 & 800 processors that can bring 4K recording capability in Mobile Phones
- Intel revealed ATOM processor for embedded markets as well as Bay Trail
- Panasonic announced a wide range of smart TVs. The Panasonic's Smart Viera HDTVs lineup includes 16 plasmas and 16 LEDs.
- Razer announced Razer Edge tablet PC
- Nvidia announces Android handheld Project Shield
- Research In Motion showed off the Blackberry 10 touch-screen phone

==== 2014 ====
The 2014 International CES was held during the week from January 7 to 10, 2014, in the Las Vegas Convention Center, Las Vegas, Nevada, United States. The first Li-Fi smartphone prototype was presented at the show. The smartphone uses SunPartner's Wysips CONNECT, a technique that converts light waves into usable energy, making the phone capable of receiving and decoding signals without drawing on its battery. The phone also has a transparent photovoltaic screen that lets light recharge the phone.

LG debuted its webOS on smartTVs and new 77-inch curved OLED Ultra HD TV. Samsung unveiled its curved TVs with two series of concave TVs.

ProtectCELL showcased its comprehensive mobile protection plans for all major devices, including the iPhone 5S and 5C, iPad Air, iPad Mini 2 and Galaxy S4. With demonstrations such as blending a Blackberry, ProtectCELL proves they will cover all damages.

The AMD presentation mentioned (among others) – the Kaveri CPU of the Steamroller architecture, Heterogenous System Architecture (HSA) lineup and the intention to build upon that, immersive experience, Mantle and AMD TrueAudio.

In the Intel keynote presentation, its CEO talked about three areas in which technology can improve: living, working, and playing. He also presented Intel Edison, a SoC of the SD card format.

Pebble announced the Pebble Steel smartwatch, which has a thin body, tactile metal buttons, and Corning Gorilla Glass.

Laser diodes were unveiled at the show that are going to be used for high-beam headlights in Audi vehicles. The high beams will be lasers, though the low beams will be light-emitting diodes. The car maker says that their high beams have a 500-meter range, which is roughly twice the distance of LED high beams. Lasers are expensive though. Lasers are smaller, brighter and more energy efficient than LED headlamps. Their laser headlamps use less than half the energy of LEDs. Laser diodes can emit 170 lumens per watt, while LEDs generate only 100 lumens. Lasers are sensitive to heat but that has not stopped their production for vehicles. Laser technology is not as advanced compared with LEDs, which have been around for decades.

==== 2015 ====
The 2015 International CES was held during the week January 6–9, 2015, in the Las Vegas Convention Center, Las Vegas, Nevada, United States. The 2015 CES was reportedly the largest in its history, with 3,600 exhibitors and 170,000 professional/industry attendees.

==== 2016 ====
The 2016 CES was held January 6–9, 2016, in Las Vegas and 3,600 companies attended; the CES 2016 venues of the Las Vegas Convention Center, the Westgate Las Vegas Resort & Casino and the Sands Expo & Convention Center had over 2.4 million square feet utilized for the event. The 2016 event had notably more security, with full-bag searches and police officers with tactical gear and search dogs.

In 2016, there were only 22 CES Innovation Awards Honorees in the Tech for a Better World category. These included Advanced Ordnance Teaching, Clinical Bidet, Ossia's Cota Wireless Power Technology, eFit, eGeeTouch Smart Fingerprint-NFC Luggage Lock, Eye Tribe Tracker Pro, homnistat, Hydrao, Jacoti Hearing Suite, K-1 Assistive Device, Luminon, MATRIX, Netatmo Presence, Noke U Locke, Owlet Baby Monitor, PanaCast 2, RemoPill, SCiO, Smart Air Purifier, The New Kano, Whirlpool Smart Top Load, and ZPower.

One of the most anticipated technologies at 2016 CES was experiencing consumer device charging without wires—or "wireless power"—as shown by companies like Energous, Ossia, and WiTricity.

==== 2017 ====
CES 2017 was held January 5–8, 2017, in Las Vegas. Even with tight security at the show, two prototype Razer triple-screen gaming laptops were stolen during the show. Min-Liang Tan, co-founder and chief executive officer of Razer, said that the company is treating the case as "industrial espionage". A Razer spokesperson said they were offering $25,000 for any "original information leading to the identification, arrest and conviction" of anyone who was involved with the crime.

==== 2018 ====
CES 2018 was held January 9–12, 2018, in Las Vegas, Nevada, United States. Many companies such as Amazon, Nvidia, and Google had a presence at the event.

The newest model of Sony's Aibo companion robot was featured here, and was noticed as one of the standout items of 2018.

In this year, there were 31 CES Innovation Award categories. CES Best of Innovation Award Honorees included Siren Diabetic Socks, 2018 Nissan Leaf, Samsung's first consumer Micro LED TV, Wi-Charge's Long-Range Wireless Power Technology, Intel Movidius Neural Compute Stick, 3D Touch Surface Display by Continental Automotive Systems, Aipoly Autonomous Store Platform, AMD Ryzen Threadripper 1950X, Amaryllo's AR4, A.I. security camera, IRIVER media player, Bang & Olufsen's BeoSound Shape, BUDDY robot by Blue Frog Robotics, HP's 3D Camera, Dell Ocean-Bound Plastics Packaging Program, ElliQ by Intuition Robotics, Ethereal Halo by Ethereal Machines, InstruMMents 01 world's first Dimensioning Instrument, Kensington VeriMark Fingerprint Key, Lancey smart space heater, LG 4K UHD Projector, Light L16 multi-aperture camera, Looxid VR, MARS smart TWS earbuds, Sproutel's social robot, Nura headphones, 1MORE ComfoBuds Pro True Wireless In-Ear Headphones, NUVIZ Head-Up Display for motorcyclists, Samsung Family Hub 3.0 Refrigerator, Trident 3 Arctic gaming console, Dynamic's WalletCard, WHILL Model Ci and Willow Wearable Breast Pump.

Celebrating CES 2018, a Las Vegas strip club even decided to introduce the public to their creations, the world's first-ever robot strippers.

==== 2019 ====
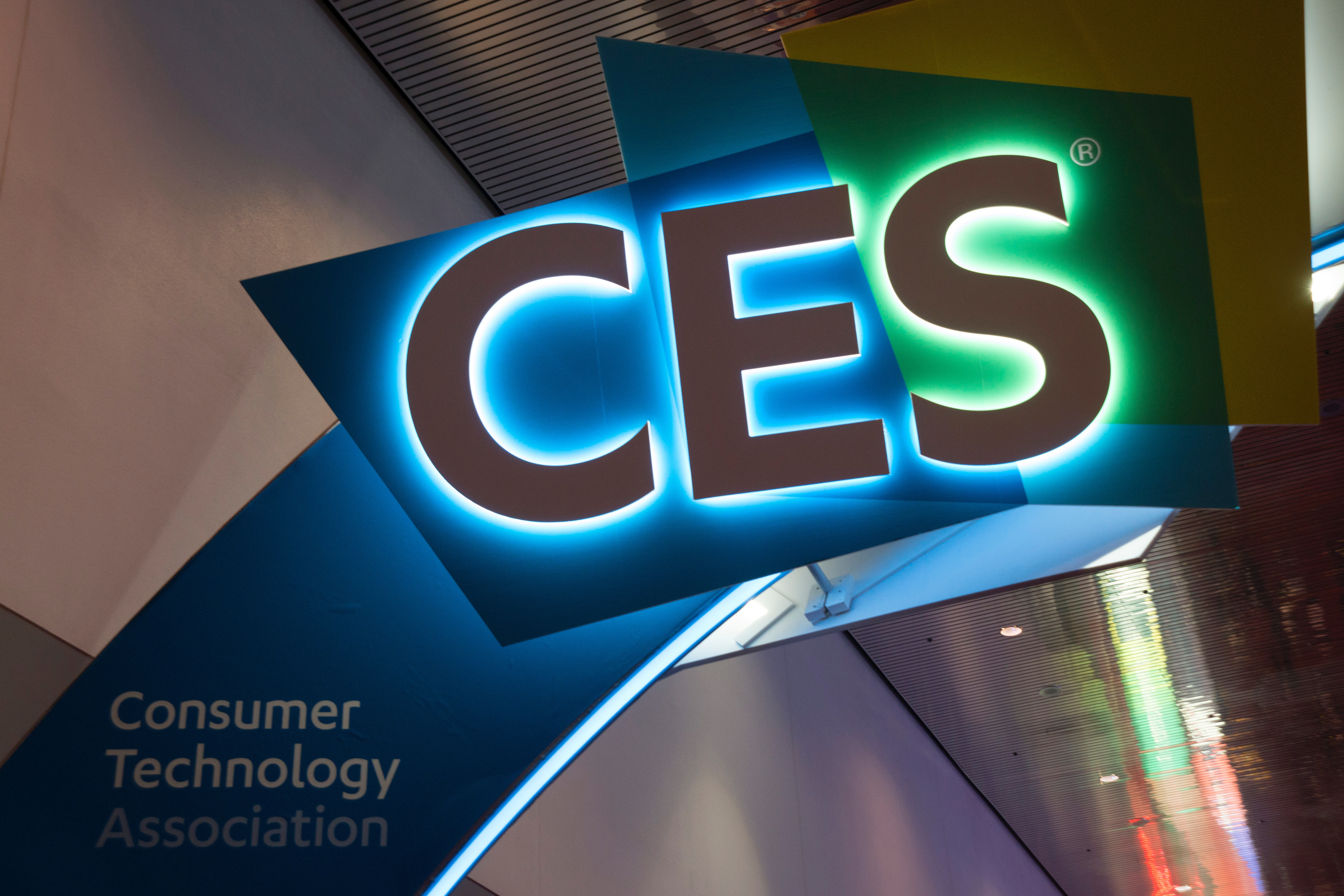
The CES logo displayed at CES 2019

CES 2019 was held on January 8–11, 2019 in Las Vegas Valley, Nevada with 182,000 total attendants and over 4400 companies exhibited. John Deere had a presence at the event while Mercedes-Benz debuted the second-generation CLA Class at the show. Hikvision and IFlytek, two companies later sanctioned by the U.S. government for allegedly enabling human rights abuses in Xinjiang with their technology, were also present.

- News Conference (Media Only) — January 6–9
- Keynotes & Conference Program at Tech East, Tech West and Tech South — January 7–11
- Exhibitors at Tech East and Tech West — January 8–11
- C Space Conference Program & Exhibits at ARLA — January 7–10

Honda introduced the Autonomous Work Vehicle and P.A.T.H. (Predicting Action of The Human) Bot at the show. Russia's search giant Yandex announced that they had been offering free driverless rides as a demo of their autonomous Yandex taxi service.

There are 30 CES Innovation Award categories. CES Best of Innovation Honorees include the KitchenAid Cook Processor Connect, LG V40 ThinQ, Zumi RoboCar, Ring Spotlight Cam, Samsung 2019 Family Hub, and the 2018 Nissan Leaf for the second time in a row. Google had set up its Google Assistant-themed ride at their booth.

Notoriously, CES received a large amount of negative press and backlash from feminists worldwide for its decision (later reversed) to revoke a CES Innovations Award for a female pleasure device presented to Lora DiCarlo, with CES stating the reasoning for the revocation was "products that are immoral, obscene, indecent, profane, or not in keeping with CTA's image will be disqualified.". The award was later reinstated.

=== 2020s ===
==== 2020 ====
The 53rd CES was held in Las Vegas, Nevada from January 7 to 10, 2020. Apple Inc. attended its first CES since 1992.

Automotive has become a major part of CES with focus on innovation in electric vehicles, infotainment, telematics, autonomous capabilities and ride sharing. Even major OEMs are now using CES to introduce new automotive technologies to the public the first time. Suppliers to the automotive industry involving electronics are increasingly present at the CES. At the CES 2020 it was particularly noticeable that a large number of vendors in autonomous (self driving) technology were present. Mercedes showcased their Vision AVTR concept car of the future inspired by the movie Avatar. Sony also showcased at CES 2020 their electric vehicle concept incorporating Sony technologies for sensors and infotainment. A range of the electric vehicles shown at CES 2020 entered production in 1–2 years from the established OEMs as well as startups such as Rivian, BYTON, Faraday Future and others.

Hyundai and Uber announced a joint-initiative at CES 2020 to develop a 100% electrically-powered flying taxi that will feature vertical take off/landing and a four-passenger capacity at 180 mph. The partnership marks the first for the Uber Elevate initiative for aerial ridesharing.

Consumer-focused internet security startup, Clario Tech Limited, launched at CES 2020, announcing their new cross-platform security application, while hosting booth #12055.

Hydraloop won Best of the Best, Best Start Up and, Best Sustainable Product at the CES 2020.

==== 2021 ====
CES 2021 was a full-digital event due to the COVID-19 pandemic.

The show ran from January 11 to 14.

CES management reviewed dozens of video conferencing platforms to find one that would support tens of thousands of people, and ultimately chose to use Microsoft Teams for the service. For exhibiting companies, the digital venue remained live for 30 days until February 15.

On January 12, 2021, Billie Eilish gave a live digital performance. Ryan Seacrest held a session discussing digital performances and spoke to Billie Eilish and Dua Lipa.

==== 2022 ====
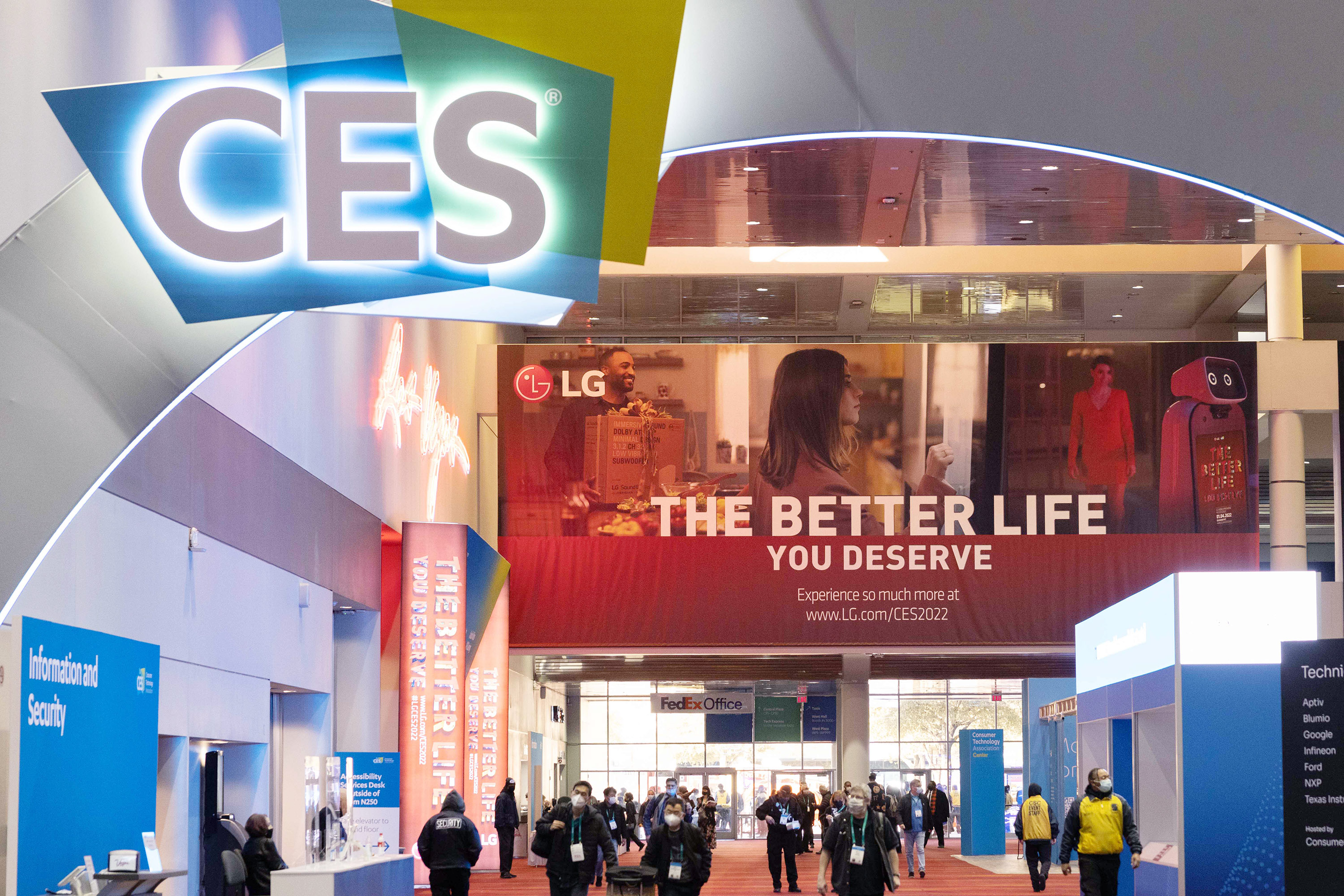
An LG billboard at the entrance of the Las Vegas Convention Center at CES 2022

The show ran from January 5 to 7. Although the show was originally scheduled to run until January 8, the Consumer Technology Association decided to close the show one day early, citing public health concerns after many companies pulled out of the in-person event.

Due to the increased SARS-CoV-2 Omicron variant infection counts reported, many companies such as Intel, Lenovo, TikTok, T-Mobile, Amazon, Google, and Meta switched to a virtual-only appearance. As of December 25, 2021, 42 exhibitors had canceled, which is approximately 7% of the total exhibit floor. Additionally, many major tech publications such as The Verge, CNET, Engadget, Gizmodo, TechCrunch, TechRadar and Tom's Guide as well as many tech YouTube channels only reported on the show remotely.

General Motors CEO Barra said the company would participate in a digital-only format, and that her keynote speech to debut the electric version of the Chevrolet Silverado EV would be delivered remotely.

Samsung Electronics introduced Bespoke Home, a consumer-tailored home appliance. The company also unveiled a micro-LED TV and QD-OLED panels. Mercedes-Benz announced the new electric concept car EQXX. Hyundai Motor Group unveiled a meta-mobility vision which combines robotics and metaverse. They also unveiled personal mobility, L7, Spot, and MobED. BMW unveiled an iX flow that uses electronic ink to change the color of the vehicle's exterior. VinFast (a member of Vingroup from Vietnam) also introduced their electric sub VF 5, VF 6, VF 7, VF 8 and VF 9. Ossia, Inc showcased the Cota Power Table, which leverages a wireless power invention created and patented by Hatem Zeine; Cota which received the 2022 CES Innovation Award in the Mobile Devices and Accessories category.

==== 2023 ====
CES 2023 was held from January 5 to 8, attracting 115,000 attendees, returning the full in-person event since CES 2020.

===== Production cars =====
- Cenntro Logistar 300
- Volkswagen ID.7

===== Concept cars =====
- BMW i Vision Dee
- Peugeot Inception
- Project Arrow
- Afeela prototype
- Ram 1500 REV
- ZF Next Generation Shuttle
- VinFast VF 6, VF 7, VF 8 & VF 9, and 4 e-bike models.

==== 2024 ====
CES 2024 was held from January 9 to 12.

===== Production cars =====
- VinFast VF 3

===== Concept cars =====
- VinFast VF Wild
- LG αble
- Hyundai MOBION
- Kia Concept PV1
- Kia Concept PV5
- Kia Concept PV7
- Honda 0 Saloon
- Honda 0 Space-Hub
- M Benz Concept CLA

==== 2025 ====
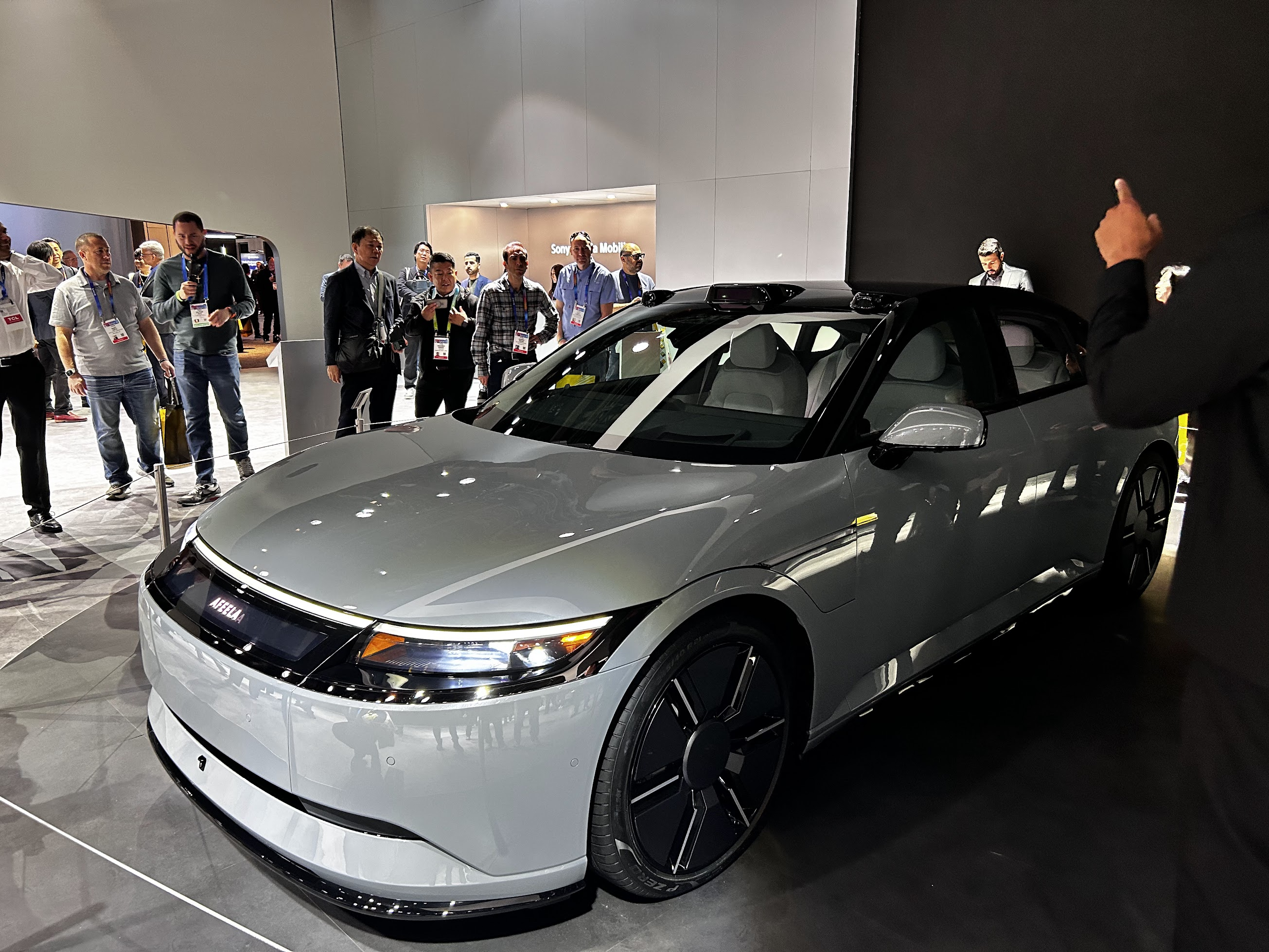
Afeela Car 1 Demo

CES 2025 was held from January 7 to 10, with over 141,000 in attendance. AI was widely represented, including in computers, gaming and robotics. Other innovations unveiled include lithium-free, paper-thin cellulose batteries and a spoon that delivers an electric current to trick the tongue into tasting salt without consuming it. Healthcare tech included AI self-balancing, omnidirectional exoskeletons for mobility, a needle-free injection gadget and "clinic-in-a-box" booths to deliver remote healthcare. Along with an array of concept cars, the XPeng AeroHT Land Aircraft Carrier combination eVTOL and 6x6 carrier van was debuted.

===== Production cars =====
- Afeela 1

===== Concept cars =====
- Honda 0 Saloon
- Honda 0 SUV

==== 2026 ====
CES 2026 was held from January 6 to 9, 2026. The highlights shown were robotics and increased screens on portables. For robots, Boston Dynamics and Hyundai's Atlas was presented, a stair climbing robot vacuum, and a robot puppy. Samsung and Motorola showed their new foldable phones such as the Motorola Razr fold, while for laptops Lenovo presented rollable OLED displays and Asus a second built-in monitor for their laptops.

== CES Asia ==
The CES created a corresponding Asian conference, CES Asia, was planned to happen annually during the month of June in Shanghai, China but has been cancelled indefinitely:

- 2019: The CES Asia 2019 took place from 11 to 13 June 2019.
- 2020: The CES Asia 2020 was originally scheduled for 10 to 12 June 2020, but was cancelled due to safety concerns caused by the COVID-19 pandemic.

== See also ==
- IFA (Berlin, Germany)
- CeBIT (Hannover, Germany)
- CEATEC (Chiba, Japan)
- Computex (Taipei, Taiwan)
- EyesOn Design#Design focus
- Mobile World Congress (Barcelona, Spain)
- GITEX (Dubai, UAE)
- LA Auto Show
- North American International Auto Show
- Viva Technology (Paris, France)
