= Olympus μ700 =

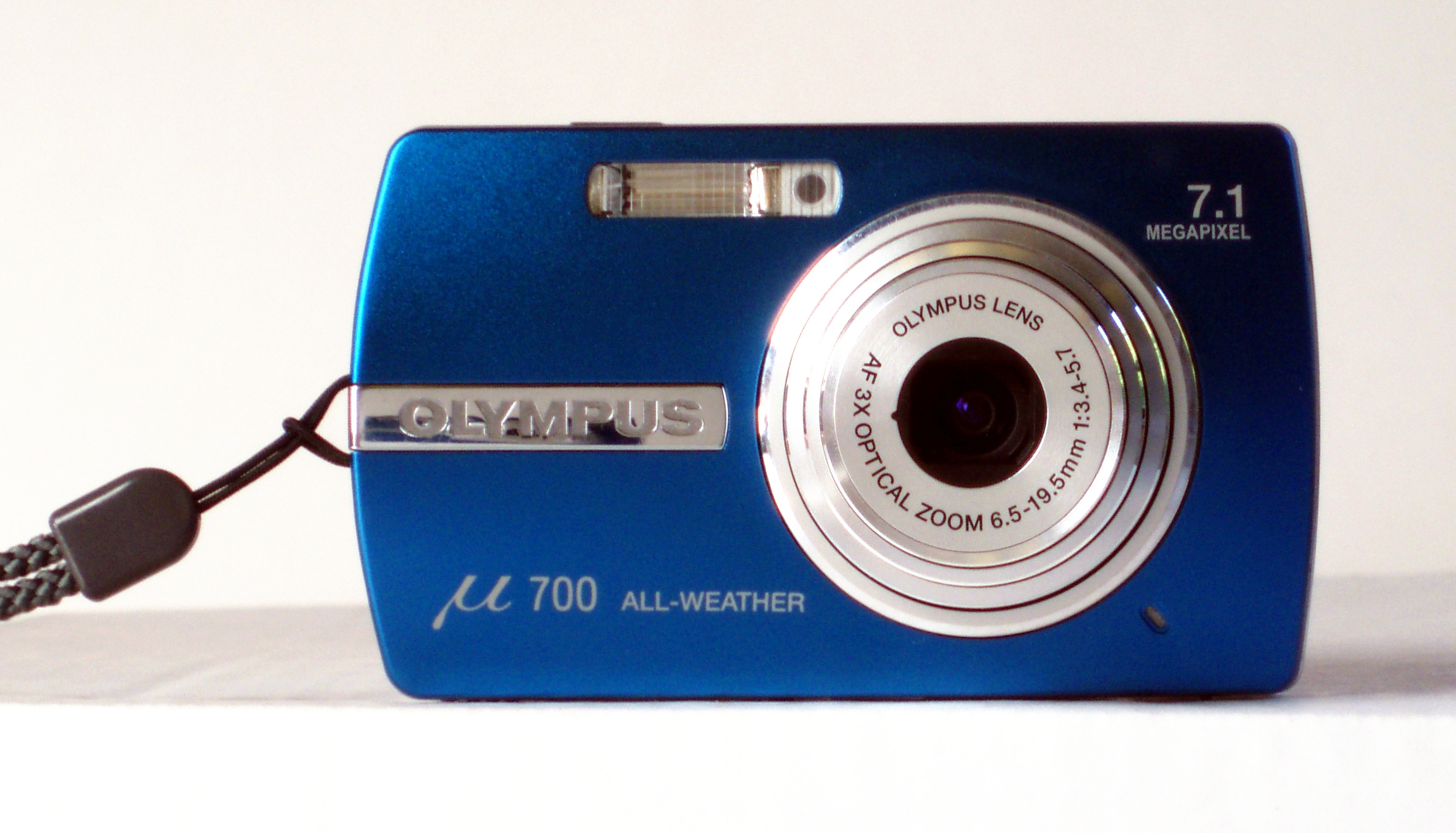
Olympus mju 700

The Olympus μ("mju") 700 — also known as the Olympus Stylus 710 in North America — is a 7.1 megapixel ultra-compact digital camera introduced by Olympus Corporation in 2006.

It features a 1/2.3″ CCD, a 3x zoom lens, and a weatherproof body like some of the other Olympus Stylus cameras and has a maximum resolution of 3072 × 2304 pixels. It is also the most lightweight camera of the Stylus line, weighing only 103 g without the battery and xD-Picture Card.

The μ700 was available in several different colors: black, silver, orange, and blue.

== Sample photos ==
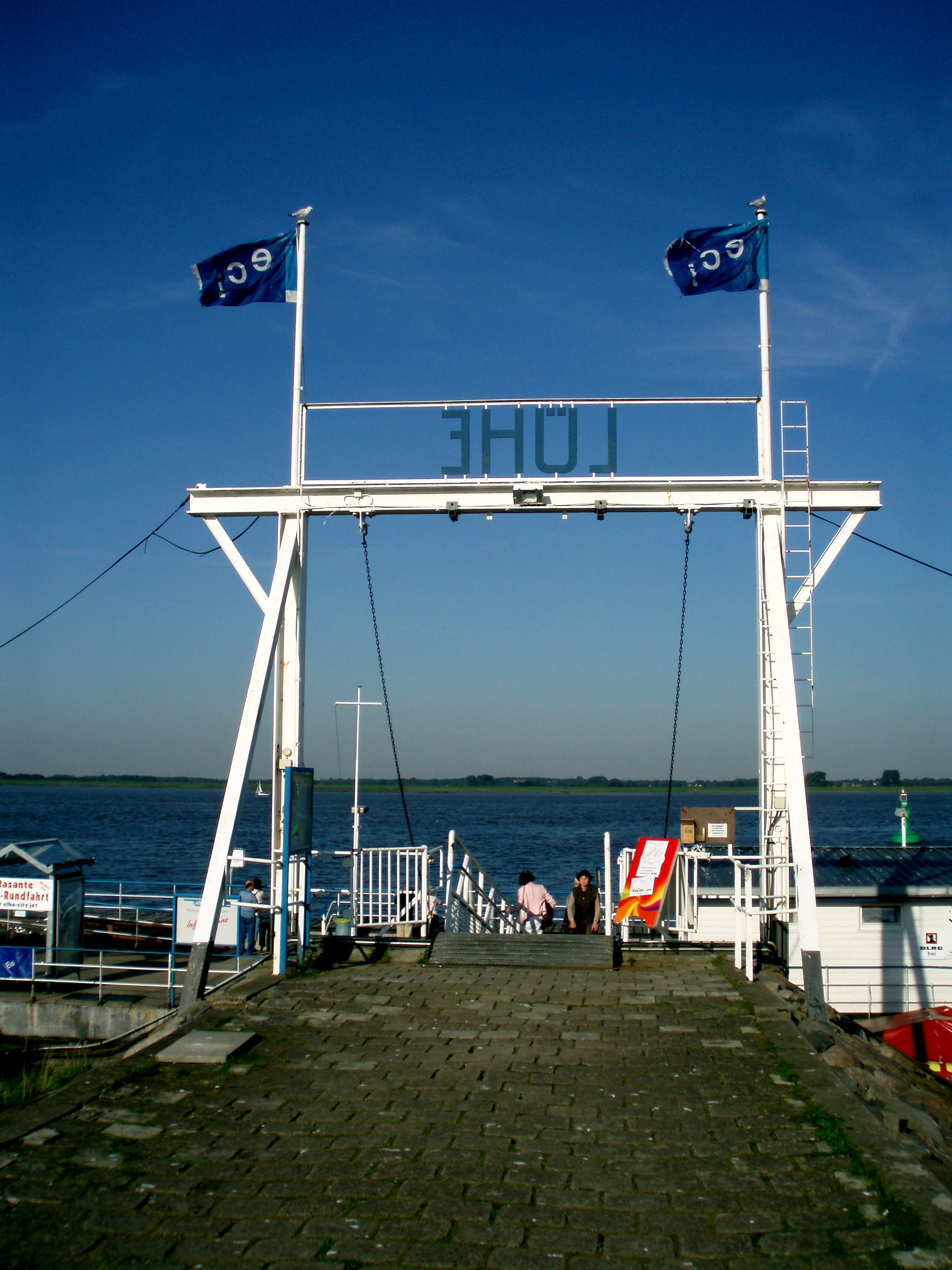

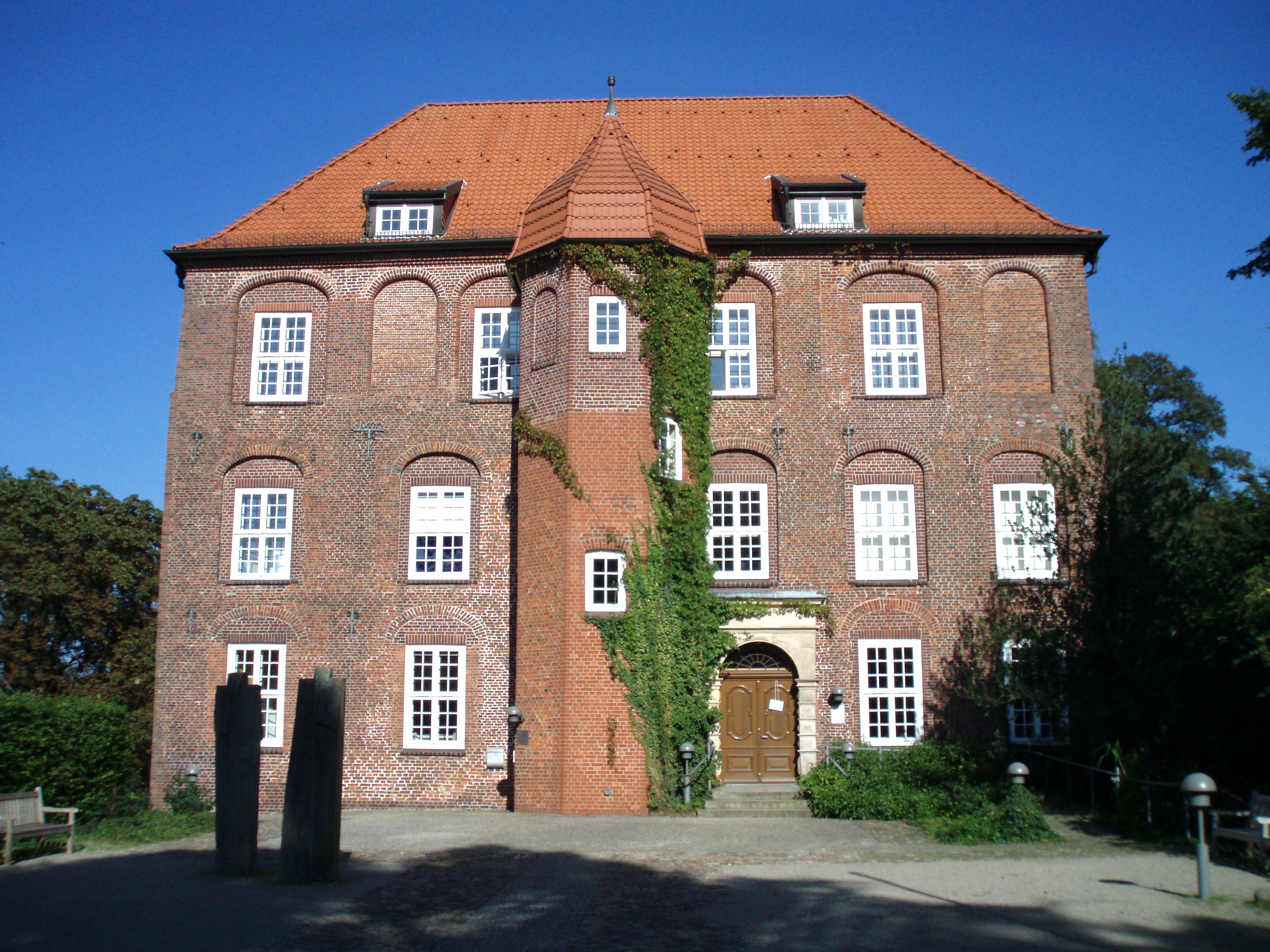

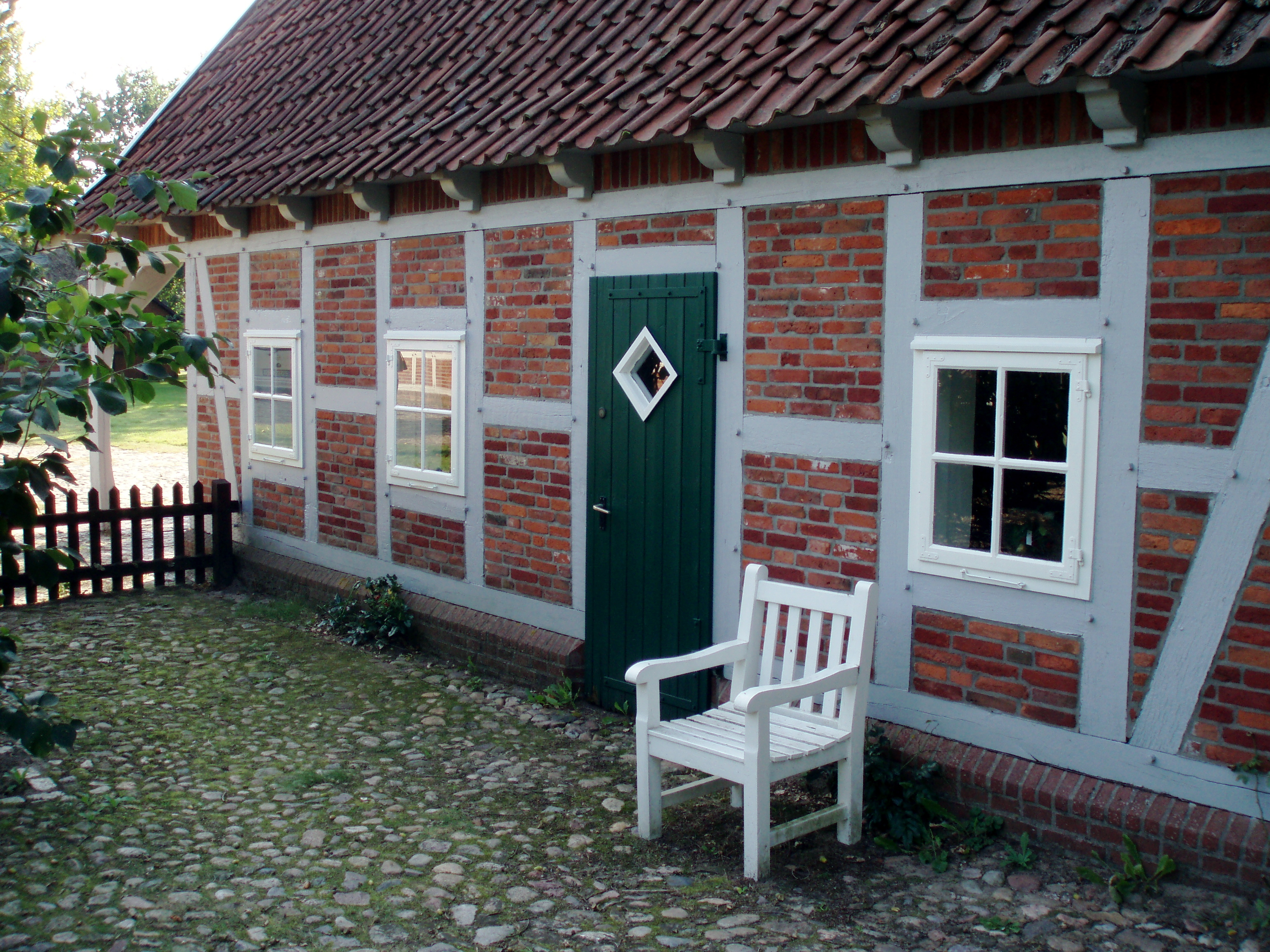

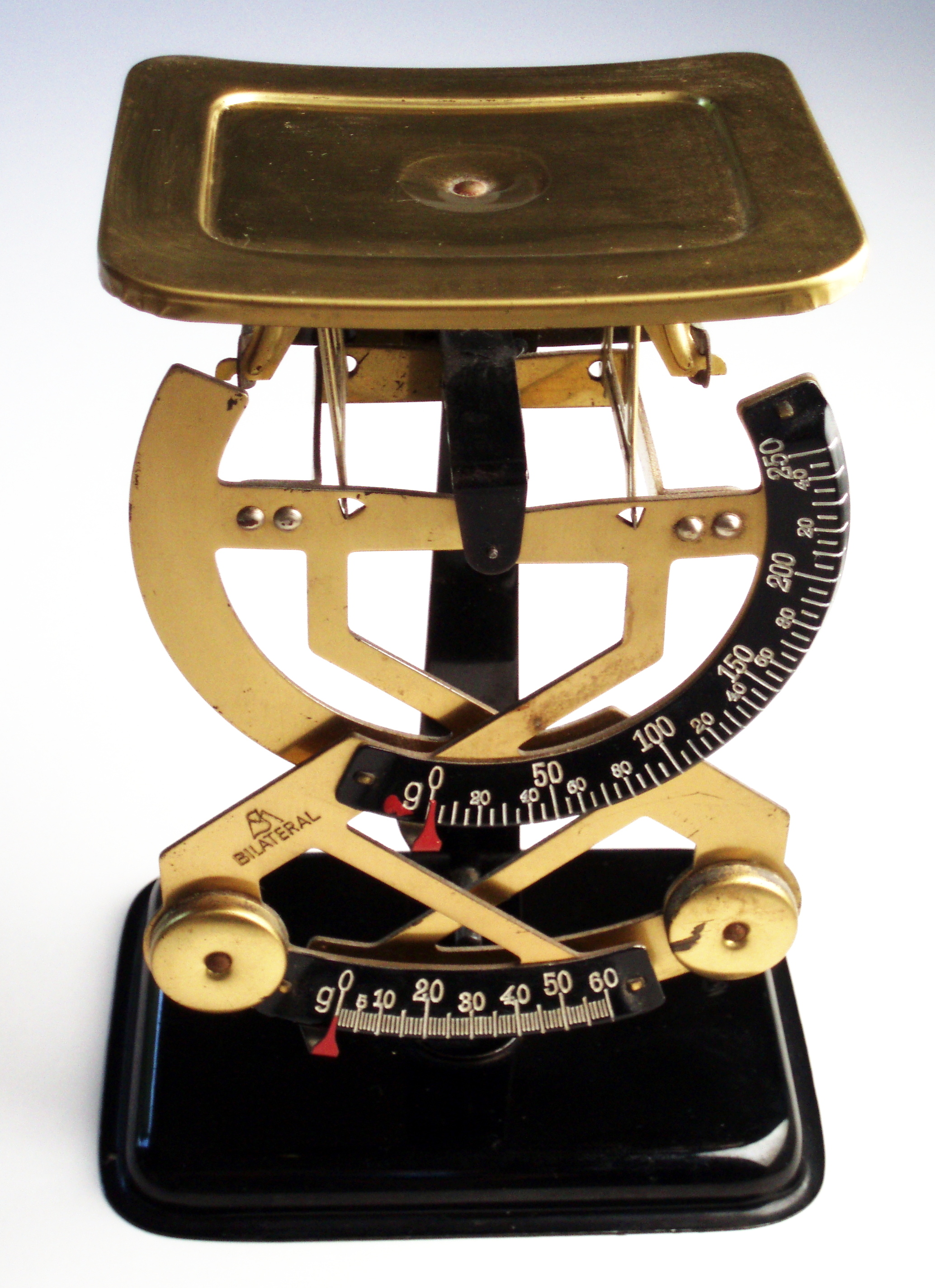
