= Olympus μ 1030 SW =

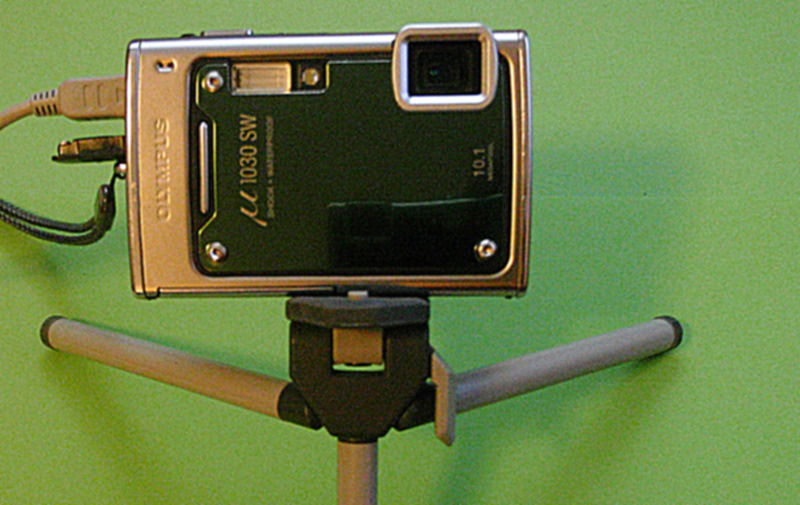
Olympus μ 1030 SW

The Olympus μ 1030 SW (also known as the Stylus 1030 SW) is 10.1 megapixel compact salt-water submersible digital camera introduced by Olympus Corporation in 2008. Shock-proof from heights of up to 2 m, waterproof up to a water pressure equivalent to 10 m depth, crushproof up to 100 kg, freezeproof up to -10 °C

Nominated as European Ultra Compact Camera 2008-2009 by EISA (The European Imaging and Sound Association).

== Features ==
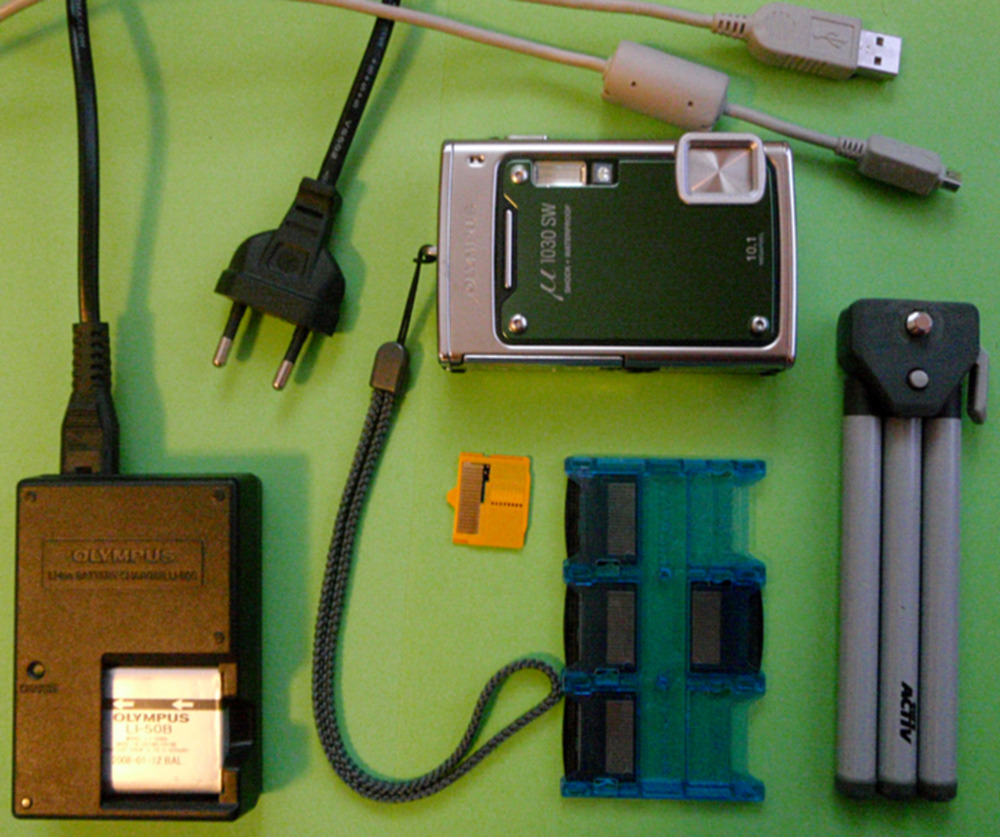
Olympus μ 1030 SW

- Image sensor: Effective pixels 10.1 Megapixels, Filter array Primary colour filter (RGB)
- Type 1/2.33" CCD sensor
- Lens Optical zoom 3.6 x, Focal length 5.0 - 18.2 mm (equiv. 35mm: 28 – 102 mm), LCD Resolution 230000 dots
- Monitor size 69 millimetres (2.7 in)
- Movie quality 640x480/30 frame/s
- Internal memory 14.7 MB
- Image Size:
  - 10M 3648 x 2736
  - 5M 2560 x 1920
  - 4M 2304 x 1728
  - 3M 2048 x 1536
  - 2M 1600 x 1200
  - 1M 1280 x 960
  - VGA 640 x 480
  - 16:9 1920 x 1080
- Interface - USB 2.0
