= Olympus μ720 SW =

The Olympus μ("mju") 720 SW — also known as the Olympus Stylus 720 SW in North America — is a 7.1 megapixel ultra-compact salt-water submersible digital camera introduced by Olympus Corporation in 2006.

It features

- a 1/2.3″ CCD
  - 7,380,000 gross / 7,110,010 effective pixels
- 6.7–20.1 mm + 3x Optical zoom lens (35 mm camera equiv. to 38–114 mm) f/3.5–f/5.0
- Stainless steel & chrome body (SW) shockproof (1.5m drop) & waterproof (up to 3m 10 ft)
- Maximum resolution of 3072 × 2304 pixels.
- Dimensions: 91 × 58.7 × 19.8 mm
- Weight 153 g + 15g battery + 1g xD-Picture card
- M or H xD-Picture Card.

The μ 720 SW is available in several different colors: chrome-silver, light-red, and blue.
