= U10D, S300D, u300D =

U10D, S300D, u300D is a camera model designator for a digital cameras in the mju series manufactured by Olympus, which were sold by the names "μ-10 Digital" in Japan, "μ300 Digital" in Europe, and "Stylus 300 Digital" in North America. This text string is among the information embedded by the camera in the coding of the .JPEG image, mostly to help a computer find a compatible program (PictureViewer, Preview, etc.) to open it if it's not properly suffixed.

The Olympus μ-10 Digital, Stylus 300 Digital, and μ300 Digital weigh 165 grams, and are 99mm x 56mm x 33.5mm. They uses an XD-Picture Card for storage, and connect to a computer using USB. The cameras come with Olympus Camedia Master which allows a user to download and edit photos.

== Features ==
- 3.2 megapixels
- 3x Optical zoom
- Movie recording mode
- Up to 4x Digital zoom
- 1.5" LCD screen
- Li-Ion Rechargeable battery
