= Olympus Stylus Epic =

35mm compact camera

Stylus Epic / μ[mju:]-II
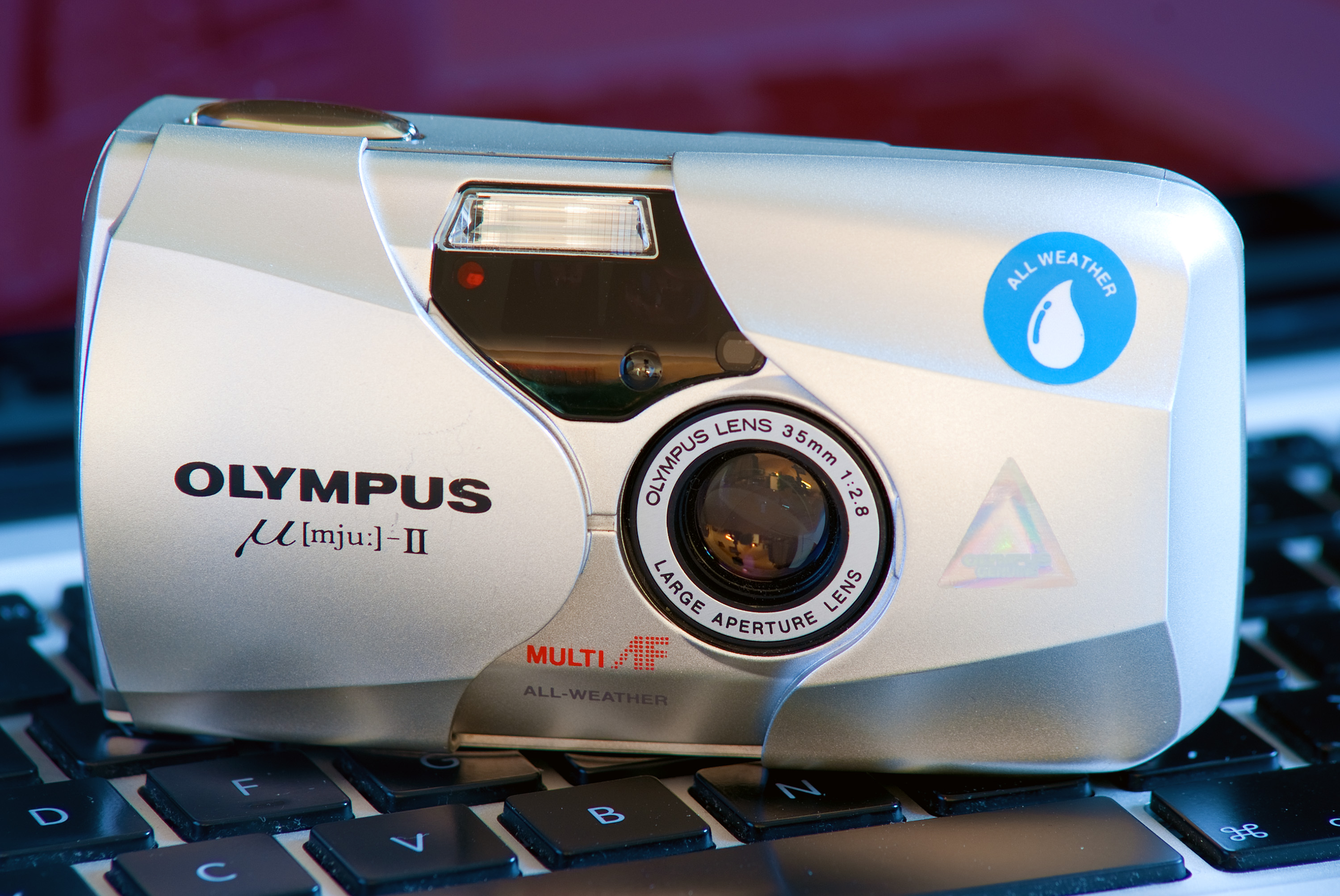
- Olympus Stylus Epic

Overview
- Maker: Olympus Corporation
- Type: 35 mm compact
- Released: 1997

Lens
- Lens mount: Fixed
- Lens: 1:2.8 35 mm
- F-numbers: f/2.8 to f/11

Sensor/medium
- Film speed: ISO 100 to 3200, DX-coded

Focusing
- Focus: Active multi-beam autofocus

Exposure/metering
- Exposure: Automatic

Flash
- Flash: Built-in

Shutter
- Shutter speed range: 4s to 1/1000 s

General
- Battery: CR123A 3V lithium
- Dimensions: 108×59×35 mm (4.3×2.3×1.4 in)
- Weight: 145 g (5 oz)

The Olympus Stylus Epic, also known as the μ[mju:]-II in other parts of the world, is a 35mm compact camera. Introduced in 1997, the Olympus Stylus Epic followed a long line of fixed focal length, budget priced, consumer level, point and shoot cameras from Olympus.

The Epic has a fixed 35mm f/2.8 lens, and can focus down to 35 centimetres (14 in). The camera is lightweight at 145 grams (5.1 oz) and splash proof.

The fixed lens on this camera is much faster than other Olympus point-and-shoots, many of which include zoom lenses. The zoom lens versions have much slower lenses (f/4.5 at the wide end), and in general, lower quality optics, compared to the fixed 35mm lens.

The "active three spot" automatic exposure system on this camera is quite sophisticated for a point and shoot. It can handle situations like focusing properly when photographing two people with a gap between them. Other cameras would focus on the center (infinity), and the subjects would end up out of focus. You can also set the flash to fire regardless of the level of ambient light to provide "fill flash" functionality.

The automatic exposure tends to favor more wide-open exposure. The lens center is sharp even when wide open, though the corners are soft. There is a fair amount of vignetting, wide open. Red eye can be a problem, with the flash so close to the lens. Red eye reduction is available, but this slows down the shot.

The camera moves the lens after the shutter is depressed, which results in a small (0.25 second) delay. The lens can be pre-focused but does not move into position until the shutter button is fully depressed. This behavior is standard in film point and shoot cameras.

It only has four DX-code reading contacts instead of the normal six, limiting the available ISO settings to complete stops, i.e., 100, 200, 400, 800, 1600, and 3200.

== Flash modes ==
It has the following flash modes:

- Automatic
- Red eye reduction – this camera uses a series of low power pre-flashes rather than a separate bulb
- Flash off – This will cause the camera to automatically use a slower shutter speed necessitating the use of a tripod or similar
- Fill-in flash
- Night scene flash – This also uses a slow shutter speed and is incompatible with spot-metering mode
- Red eye reduction night scene flash
