= Mu (letter) =

Twelfth letter of the Greek alphabet

Mu (/ˈm(j)uː/; uppercase Μ, lowercase μ; Ancient Greek μῦ [mŷː], Greek: μι or μυ—both [mi]) is the 12th letter of the Greek alphabet, representing the voiced bilabial nasal IPA: [m]. In the system of Greek numerals it has a value of 40. Mu was derived from the Egyptian hieroglyphic symbol for water, which had been simplified by the Phoenicians and named after their word for water, to become the letter mem (𐤌). Letters that derive from mu include the Latin M and the Cyrillic М, though the lowercase resembles a small Latin U (u).

Greek letter mu

== Names ==
=== Ancient Greek ===
In Greek, the name of the letter was written μῦ and pronounced [mŷː].

=== Modern Greek ===
In Modern Greek, the letter is spelled μι and pronounced [mi]. In polytonic orthography, it is written with an acute accent: μί.

== Use as symbol ==
The lowercase letter mu (μ) is used as a special symbol in many academic fields. Uppercase mu is not used, because it appears identical to Latin M.

=== Prefix for units of measurement ===
"μ" is used as a unit prefix denoting a factor of 10^{−6} (one millionth), in this context, the symbol's name is "micro". It is the only unit prefix that is not composed of Latin letters.

- "Micro" is an International System of Units prefix, also known as an "SI prefix".
- The micrometre with a symbol of "μm" can also be referred to as the non-SI term "micron".

=== Mathematics ===
"μ" is conventionally used to denote certain things; however, any Greek letter or other symbol may be used freely as a variable name.

- A measure in measure theory
- Minimalization in computability theory and recursion theory
- The integrating factor in ordinary differential equations
- The degree of membership in a fuzzy set
- The Möbius function in number theory
- The population mean or expected value in probability and statistics
- The service or departure rate in queueing theory
- The Ramanujan–Soldner constant

=== Physics and engineering ===
In classical physics and engineering:

- The coefficient of friction (also used in aviation as braking coefficient—see braking action)
- Reduced mass in the two-body problem
- Standard gravitational parameter in celestial mechanics
- Linear density, or mass per unit length, in strings and other one-dimensional objects
- Permeability in electromagnetism
- The magnetic dipole moment of a current-carrying coil
- Dynamic viscosity in fluid mechanics
- The amplification factor or voltage gain of a triode vacuum tube
- The electrical mobility of a charged particle
- The rotor advance ratio, the ratio of aircraft airspeed to rotor-tip speed in rotorcraft
- The pore water pressure in saturated soil
- The shear modulus in solid mechanics

In particle physics:

- Elementary particles: muon and antimuon (μ^{−}, μ^{+}), muon neutrino and antineutrino (ν_{μ}, ν̅_{μ})
- The proton-to-electron mass ratio

In thermodynamics:

- The chemical potential of a system or component of a system

=== Computer science ===
In evolutionary algorithms:

- μ, population size from which in each generation λ offspring will generate (the terms μ and λ originate from evolution strategy notation)

In type theory:

- Used to introduce a recursive data type. For example, $\text{list}(\tau) = \mu{}\alpha{}.1 + \tau{}\alpha$ is the type of lists with elements of type $\tau$ (a type variable): a sum of unit, representing nil, with a pair of a $\tau$ and another $\text{list}(\tau)$ (represented by $\alpha$). In this notation, $\mu$ is a binding form, where the variable ($\alpha$) introduced by $\mu$ is bound within the following term ($1 + \tau{}\alpha$) to the term itself. Via substitution and arithmetic, the type expands to $1 + \tau + \tau^2 + \tau^3 + \cdots$, an infinite sum of ever-increasing products of $\tau$ (that is, a $\tau{}\text{ list}$ is any $k$-tuple of values of type $\tau$ for any $k \ge 0$). Another way to express the same type is $\text{list}(\tau) = 1 + \tau{}\text{list}(\tau)$.

=== Chemistry ===
In chemistry:

- The prefix given in IUPAC nomenclature for a bridging ligand

=== Biology ===
In biology:

- The mutation rate in population genetics
- A class of Immunoglobulin heavy chain that defines IgM type Antibodies

=== Pharmacology ===
In pharmacology:

- An important opiate receptor

=== Orbital mechanics ===
In orbital mechanics:

- Standard gravitational parameter of a celestial body, the product of the gravitational constant G and the mass M.
- Planetary discriminant, represents an experimental measure of the actual degree of cleanliness of the orbital zone, a criterion for defining a planet. The value of μ is calculated by dividing the mass of the candidate body by the total mass of the other objects that share its orbital zone.

=== Music ===
- Mu chord or mu major chord
- Electronic musician Mike Paradinas runs the label Planet Mu which utilizes the letter as its logo, and releases music under the pseudonym μ-Ziq, pronounced "music"
- Used as the name of the school idol group μ's, pronounced "muse", consisting of nine singing idols in the anime Love Live! School Idol Project
- Official fandom name of Kpop group f(x), appearing as either MeU or 'μ'
- Hip-hop artist Muonboy has taken inspiration from the particle for his stage name and his first EP named Mu uses the letter as its title.

=== Cameras ===
The Olympus Corporation manufactures a series of digital cameras called Olympus μ [mju:] (known as Olympus Stylus in North America).

=== Linguistics ===
In phonology:

- Mora

In syntax:

- μP (mu phrase) can be used as the name for a functional projection.

In Celtic linguistics:

- /μ/ can represent an Old Irish nasalized labial fricative of uncertain articulation, the ancestor of the sound represented by Modern Irish mh.

== Unicode ==
The lowercase mu (as "micro sign") appeared at 0xB5 in the 8-bit ISO-8859-1 encoding, from which Unicode and many other encodings inherited it. It was also at 0xE6 in the popular CP437 on the IBM PC. Unicode designates mu as is the compatibility equivalent of the micro sign.

- U+00B5 µ MICRO SIGN (&micro;)
- U+039C Μ GREEK CAPITAL LETTER MU (&Mu;)
- U+03BC μ GREEK SMALL LETTER MU (&mu;)
- U+2C98 Ⲙ COPTIC CAPITAL LETTER MI
- U+2C99 ⲙ COPTIC SMALL LETTER MI
- U+1D6B3 𝚳 MATHEMATICAL BOLD CAPITAL MU (Note: The mathematical symbols are only for math. Stylized text should use markup.)
- U+1D6CD 𝛍 MATHEMATICAL BOLD SMALL MU
- U+1D6ED 𝛭 MATHEMATICAL ITALIC CAPITAL MU
- U+1D707 𝜇 MATHEMATICAL ITALIC SMALL MU
- U+1D727 𝜧 MATHEMATICAL BOLD ITALIC CAPITAL MU
- U+1D741 𝝁 MATHEMATICAL BOLD ITALIC SMALL MU
- U+1D761 𝝡 MATHEMATICAL SANS-SERIF BOLD CAPITAL MU
- U+1D77B 𝝻 MATHEMATICAL SANS-SERIF BOLD SMALL MU
- U+1D79B 𝞛 MATHEMATICAL SANS-SERIF BOLD ITALIC CAPITAL MU
- U+1D7B5 𝞵 MATHEMATICAL SANS-SERIF BOLD ITALIC SMALL MU

== See also ==
- Greek letters used in mathematics, science, and engineering
- Fraser alphabet § Consonants
