= Ultra Zoom =

Ultra Zoom is a series of digital cameras by Olympus. It may refer to:

- Olympus C-2100 Ultra Zoom (2000)
- Olympus C-700UZ (2001)
- Olympus C-720 Ultra Zoom (2002)
- Olympus C-730UZ (2002)
- Olympus C-740UZ (2003)
- Olympus C-770 Ultra Zoom (2004)
- Olympus SP-500 Ultra Zoom (2005)
- Olympus SP-510 Ultra Zoom (2006)
