= Olympus SP-510 Ultra Zoom =

Olympus SP-510UZ (Ultra Zoom)
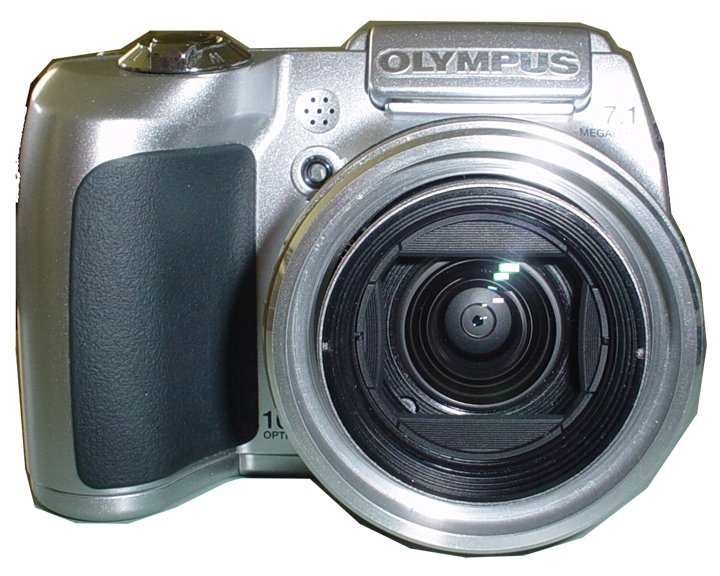

Overview
- Maker: Olympus Corporation
- Type: Bridge digital camera

Lens
- Lens: Fixed 6.3 – 63mm (38-380mm 35mm equivalent) f/2.8-3.7

Sensor/medium
- Sensor: 1/2.5" CCD
- Maximum resolution: 3,072 × 2304 (7.1 megapixels)
- Film speed: Auto,50–4000 (2500 and 4000 are used up to 3mp)
- Storage media: xD Picture Card

Focusing
- Focus modes: iESP, auto, spot AF, selective AF target, manual

Exposure/metering
- Exposure modes: Digital iESP multi-pattern, Center-Weighted, Spot

Shutter
- Shutter speed range: 15 s – 1/1000 s, Bulb
- Continuous shooting: 1.65 frame/s

Viewfinder
- Viewfinder: Electronic viewfinder

General
- LCD screen: 2.5" TFT LCD, 115,000 pixels, live preview capable
- Battery: 4 AA Batteries
- Weight: 11.6 oz / 325 g (w/o batteries and memory card)
- Made in: Indonesia

The Olympus SP-510UZ (Ultra Zoom) is a 7.1-megapixel bridge digital camera introduced by Olympus Corporation in 2006. It replaced the 6 megapixel SP-500UZ model that was launched in 2005. It was the last model of the SP-series (Special Performance) that used a 10x optical zoom lens. It was also the last of the larger-sized 10x optical ultra zoom cameras to be made by Olympus, which had been part of the C-series before the SP-series was produced. The SP-510UZ model can be traced back to the C-2100 Ultra Zoom, which was launched back in 2000. The successor model to the SP-510UZ was the SP-550UZ. It used a longer 18x optical zoom lens. Today, the newest model in the Ultra Zoom camera line, the SP-590UZ, features a 26x optical zoom lens. In 2009, Olympus released a compact camera with a 10x optical zoom lens. However, it does not use the Ultra Zoom name nor is it a part of the SP-series line of cameras.

== Features ==
The Olympus SP-510UZ features a 2.5" LCD, a 10x zoom lens, and 5x digital zoom in a compact lightweight plastic body. It is designed to satisfy the needs of both hobbyist photographers who desire full control over exposure settings and those that need only point and shoot simplicity. Two notable features of the camera is that it contains an EVF (electronic view finder), a feature found in high-end digital cameras, and the ability to capture images in RAW format. The SP-510UZ has an earlier sister model, the SP-500UZ. Two major differences between the two cameras are that the SP-500UZ has a 6.0MP sensor and has a black body while the SP-510UZ has a 7.1MP sensor and a silver body. There are also a few minor design and software differences between the two models.

== Lens ==
The lens is a 10x optical zoom aspherical glass zoom lens 6.3 – 63mm f/2.8-3.7. This is equivalent to 38-380mm in 35mm photography.

== Flash ==
The camera has a built-in manual pop-up flash.

== Movies ==
Movies with sound can be recorded, the recording time is dependent on the xD card capacity. They are in QuickTime ( .mov) format.

== Power source ==
The camera uses 4 AA batteries, which can be rechargeable. The camera also supports an AC adapter (Olympus adapter only).

== Accessories ==
The camera features a threaded barrel that can be used with an Olympus CLA-4 55mm or compatible aftermarket adapter tube. With it, users can attach a filter and/or an auxiliary wide-angle or telephoto lens.
