= Olympus C-730UZ =

C-730 Ultra Zoom
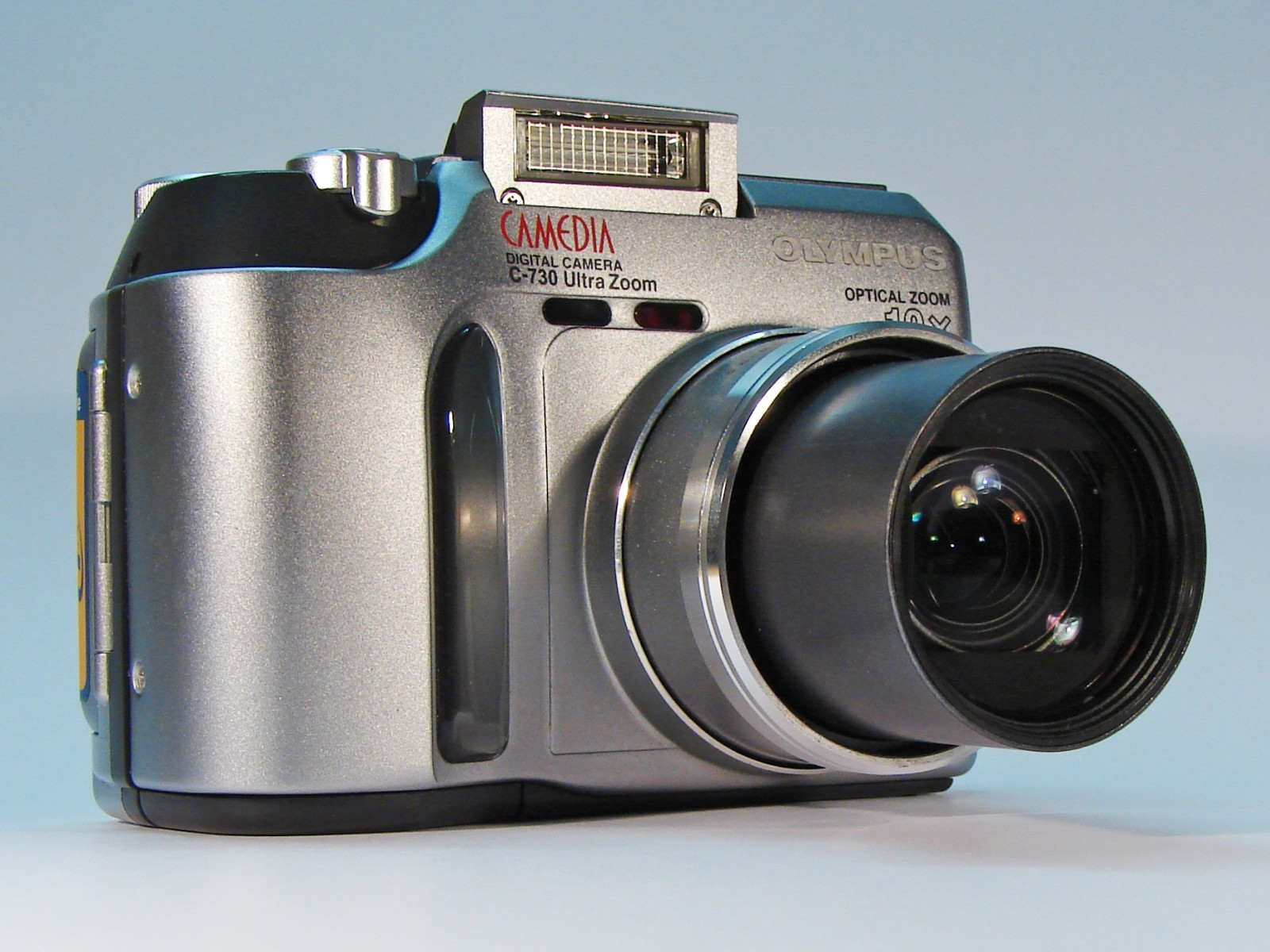

Overview
- Maker: Olympus Optical Co. Ltd.
- Type: Still image camera with motion capability

Lens
- Lens: Permanently attached 10X lens
- F-numbers: f2.8/f3.5 – f/8

Sensor/medium
- Sensor type: 0.37 in (9.4 mm) Digital CCD
- Sensor size: 3.2 effective megapixels
- Recording medium: xD Picture Card or SmartMedia card, removable

Focusing
- Focus: Automatic, Manual

Shutter
- Shutter speeds: 1/1000 s–16 s

The Olympus C-730UZ is a digital camera manufactured by Olympus. It was first released in 2002.

== Features and lens ==
The UZ in the camera's name refers to Ultra Zoom; 10 times zoom being a significant increase over the more standard three times zoom capability of standard digital cameras. The lens is an Olympus aspherical glass zoom lens 5.9–59 mm. The 10x zoom is equivalent to 38–380 mm in 35 mm photography. The specifications describe it as a "multivariator 2 aspherical glass 10x zoom".

== Flash ==
The camera has a built-in manual pop-up flash.

== Movies ==
Movies can be recorded with sound and the recording time is dependent on the memory card capacity. They are in QuickTime (.mov) format.

== Power source ==
The camera can use AA batteries (4) including rechargeable batteries. Alternatively it also takes two LB-01(CR-V3) lithium batteries.

== Images ==
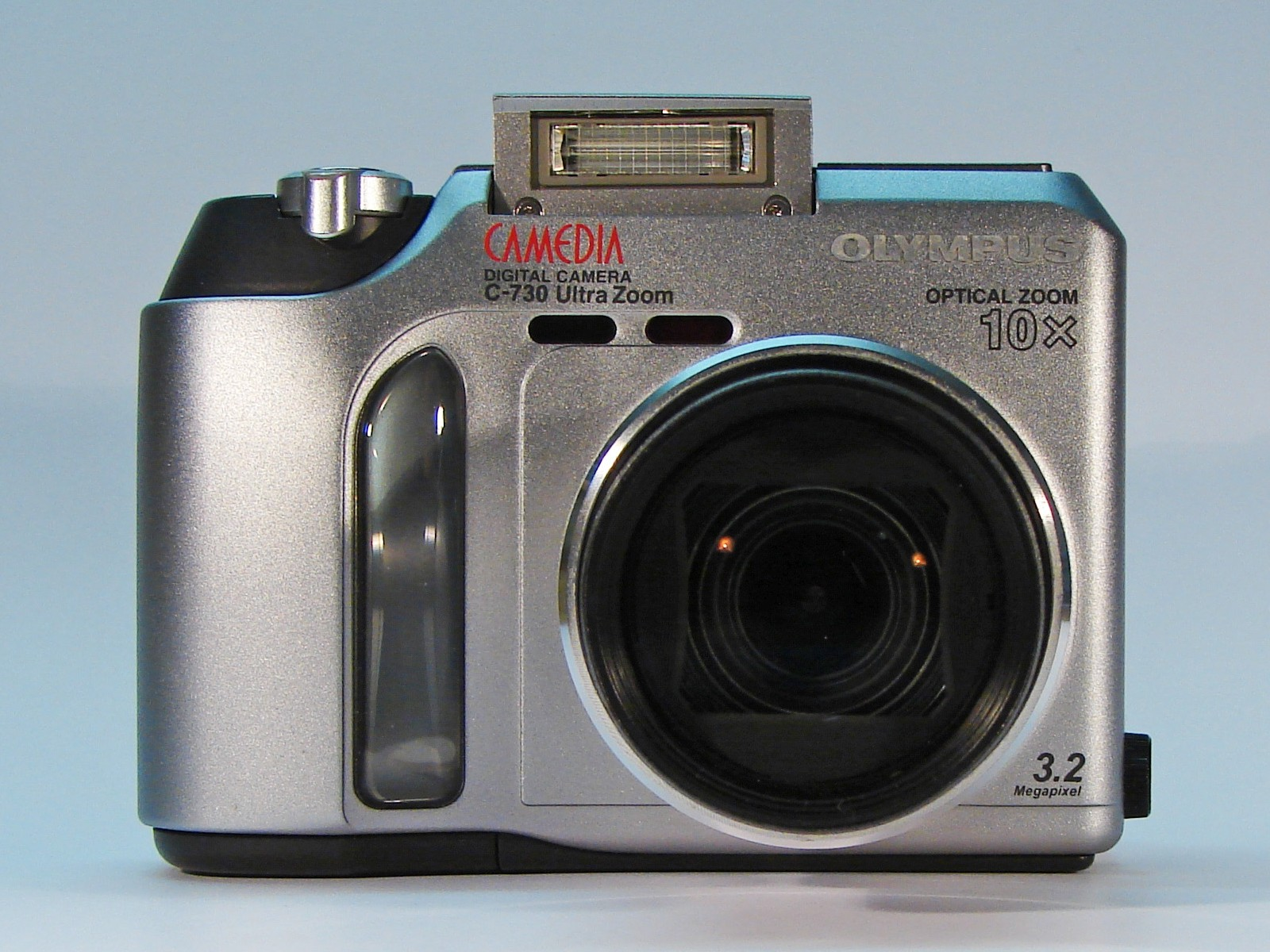

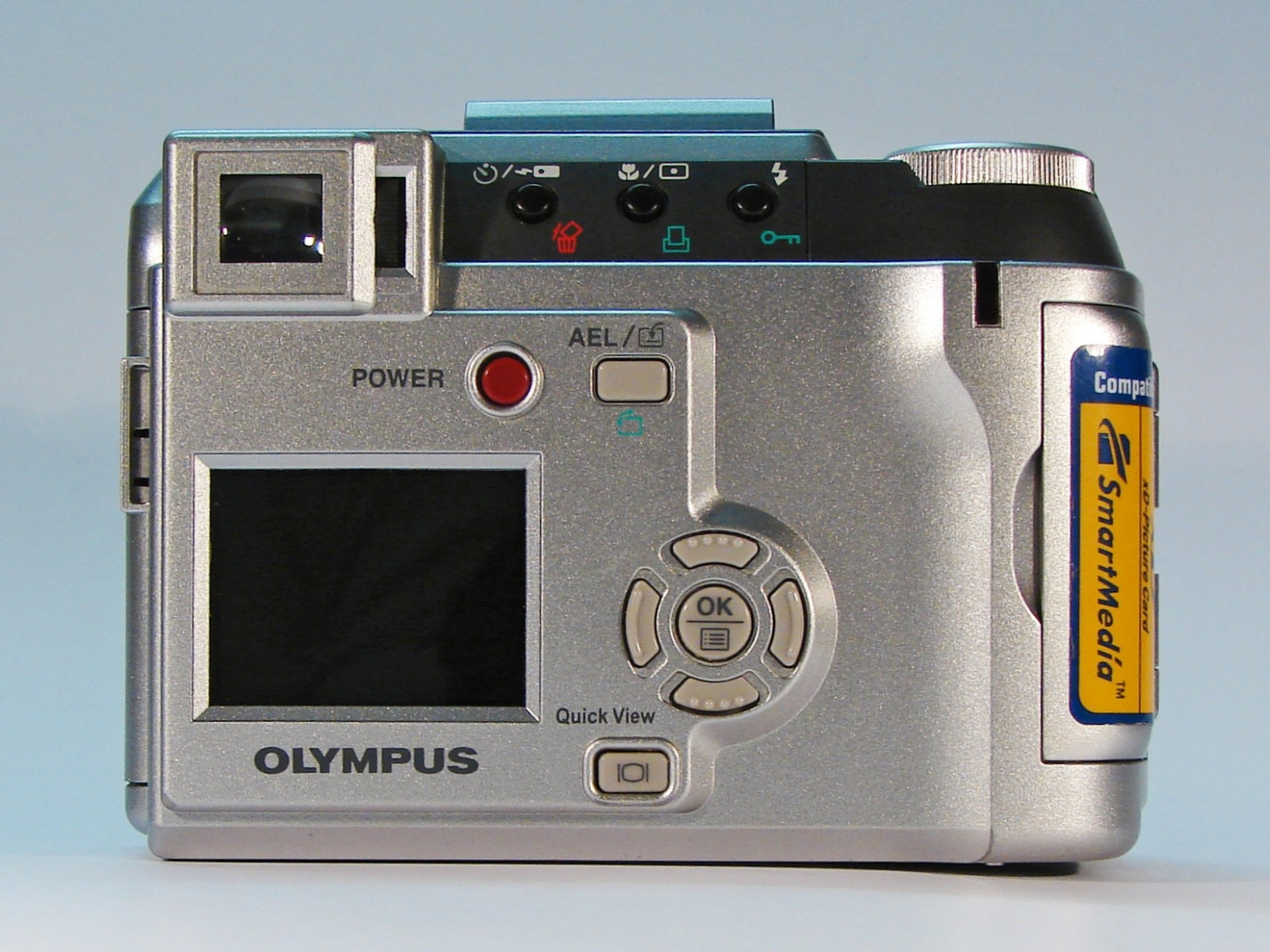

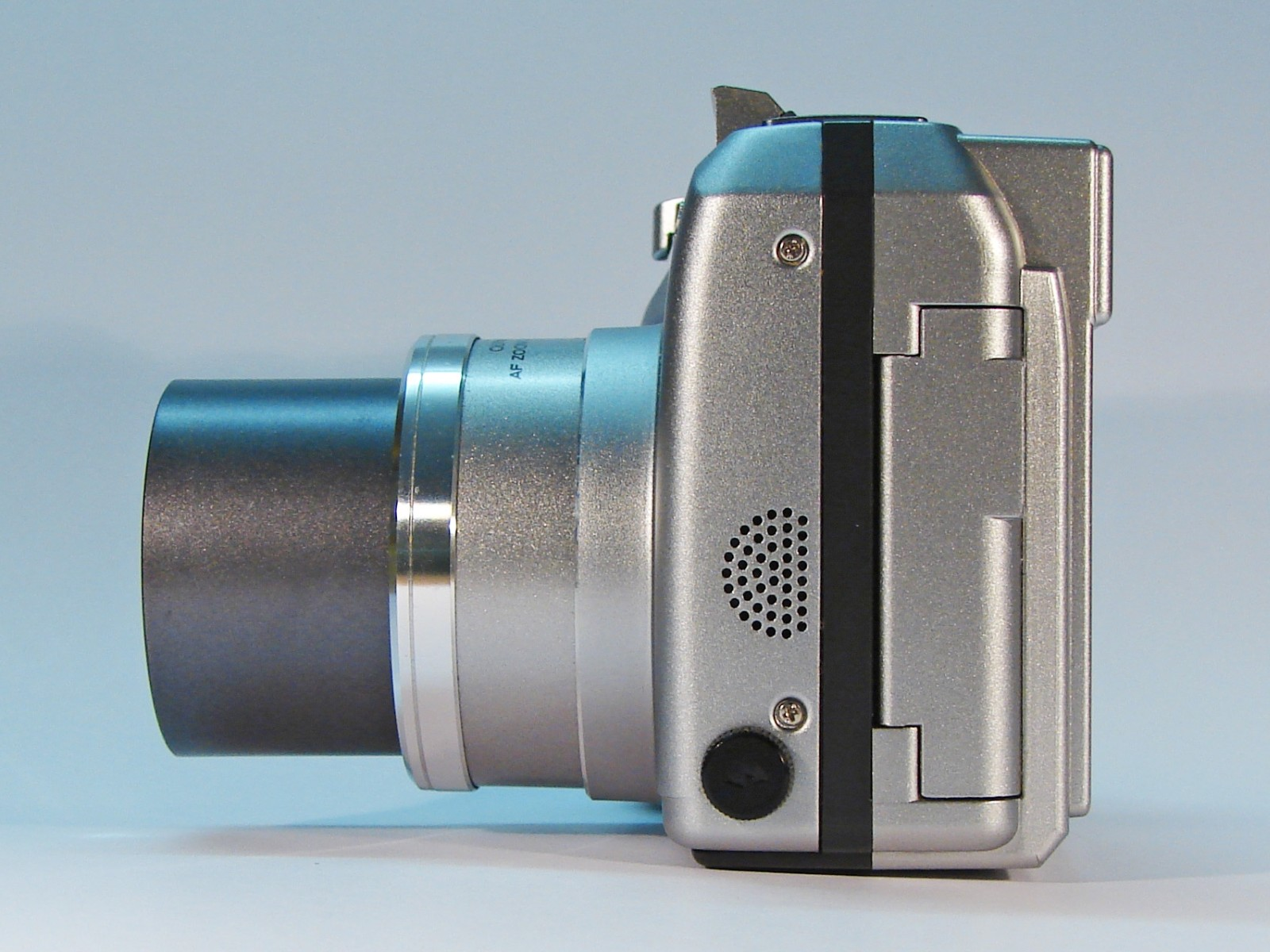

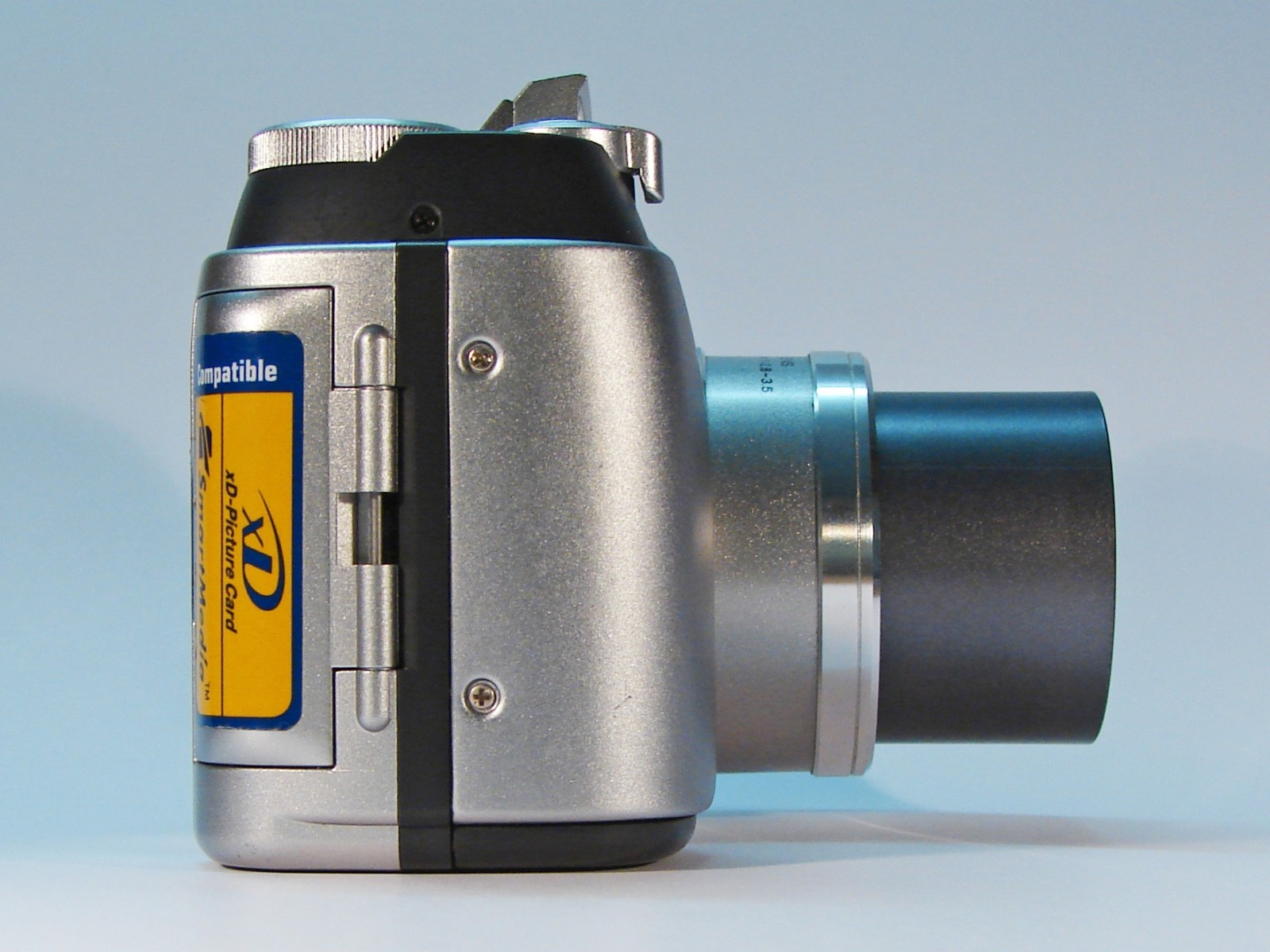

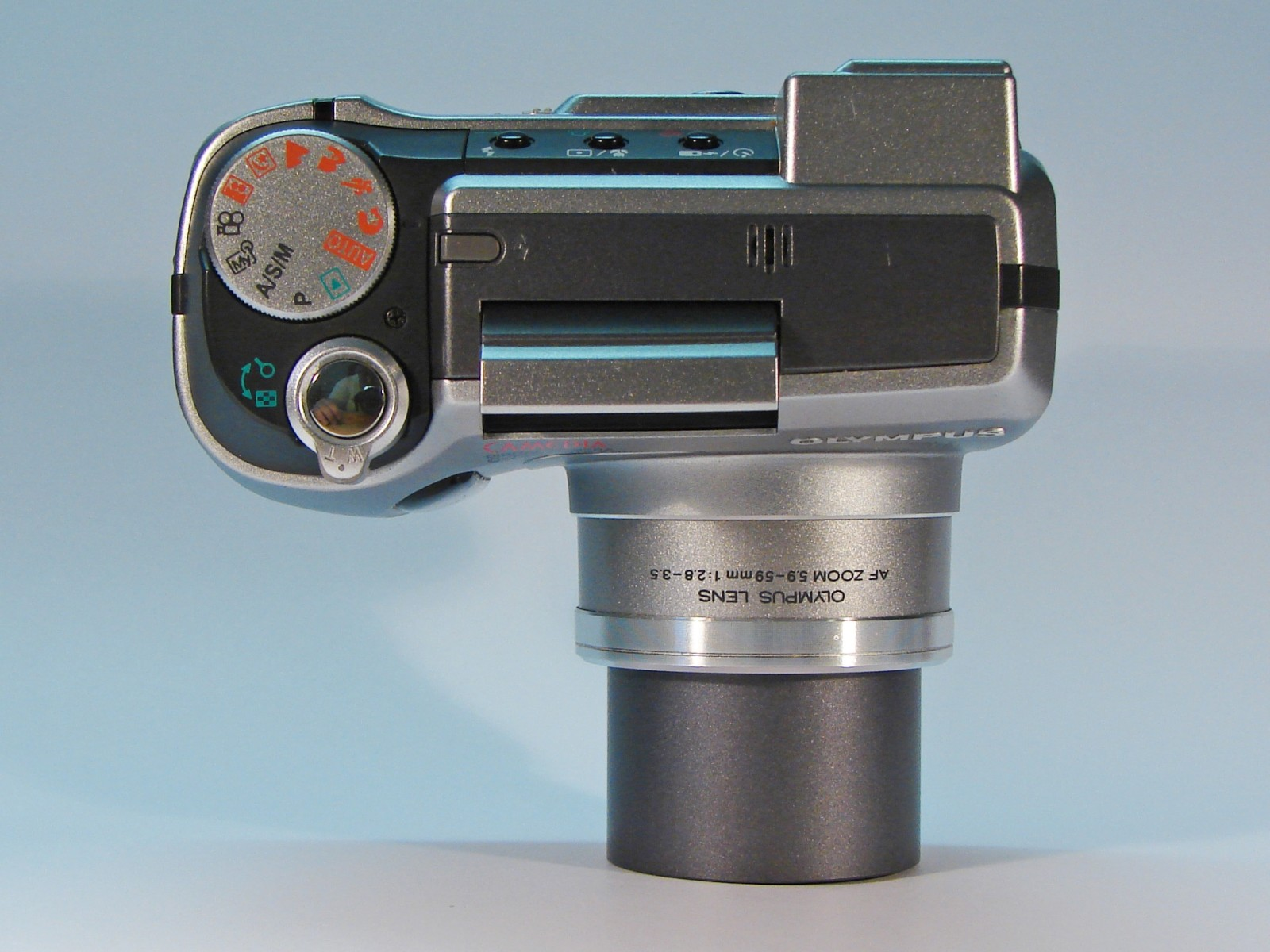

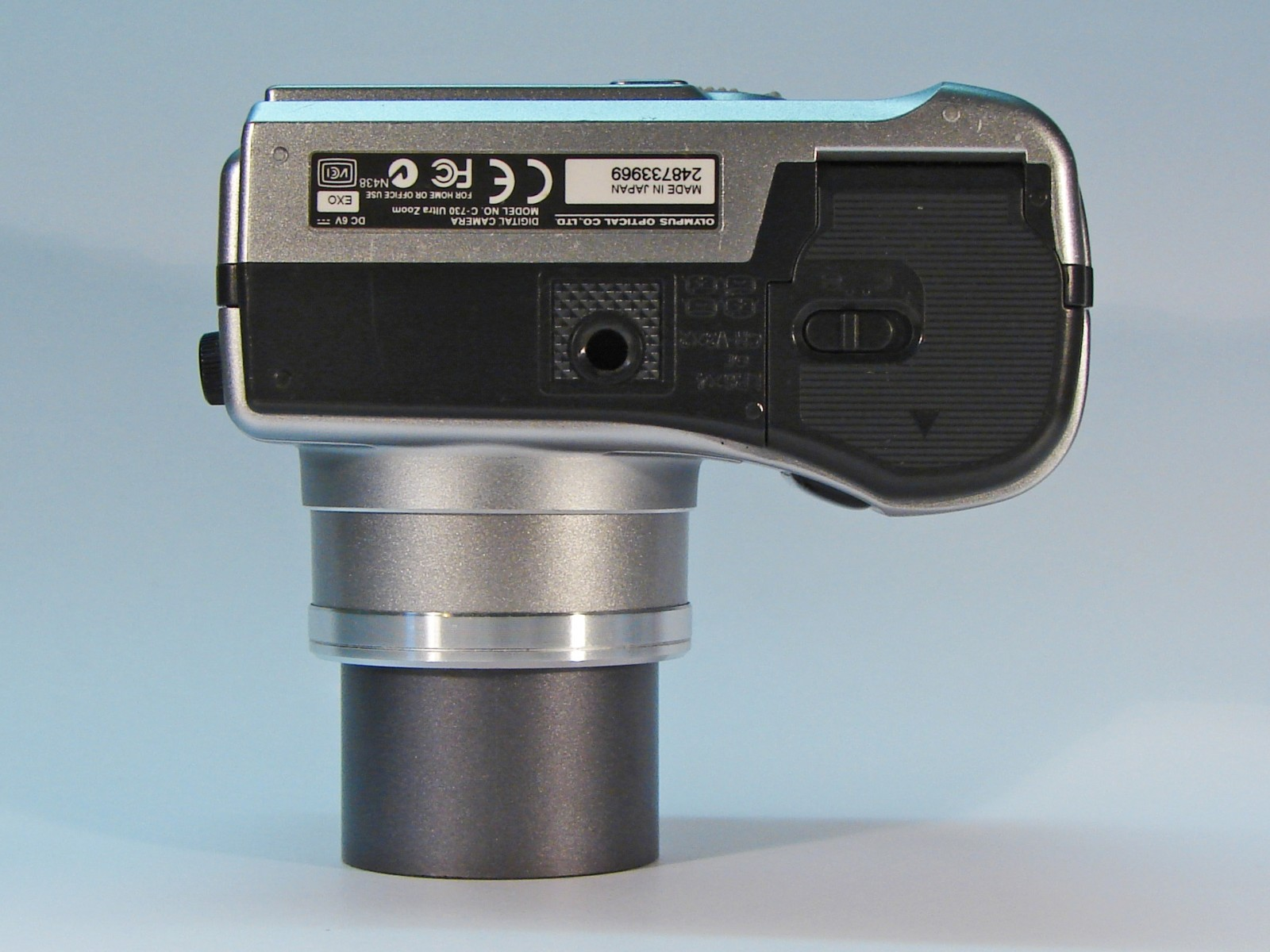

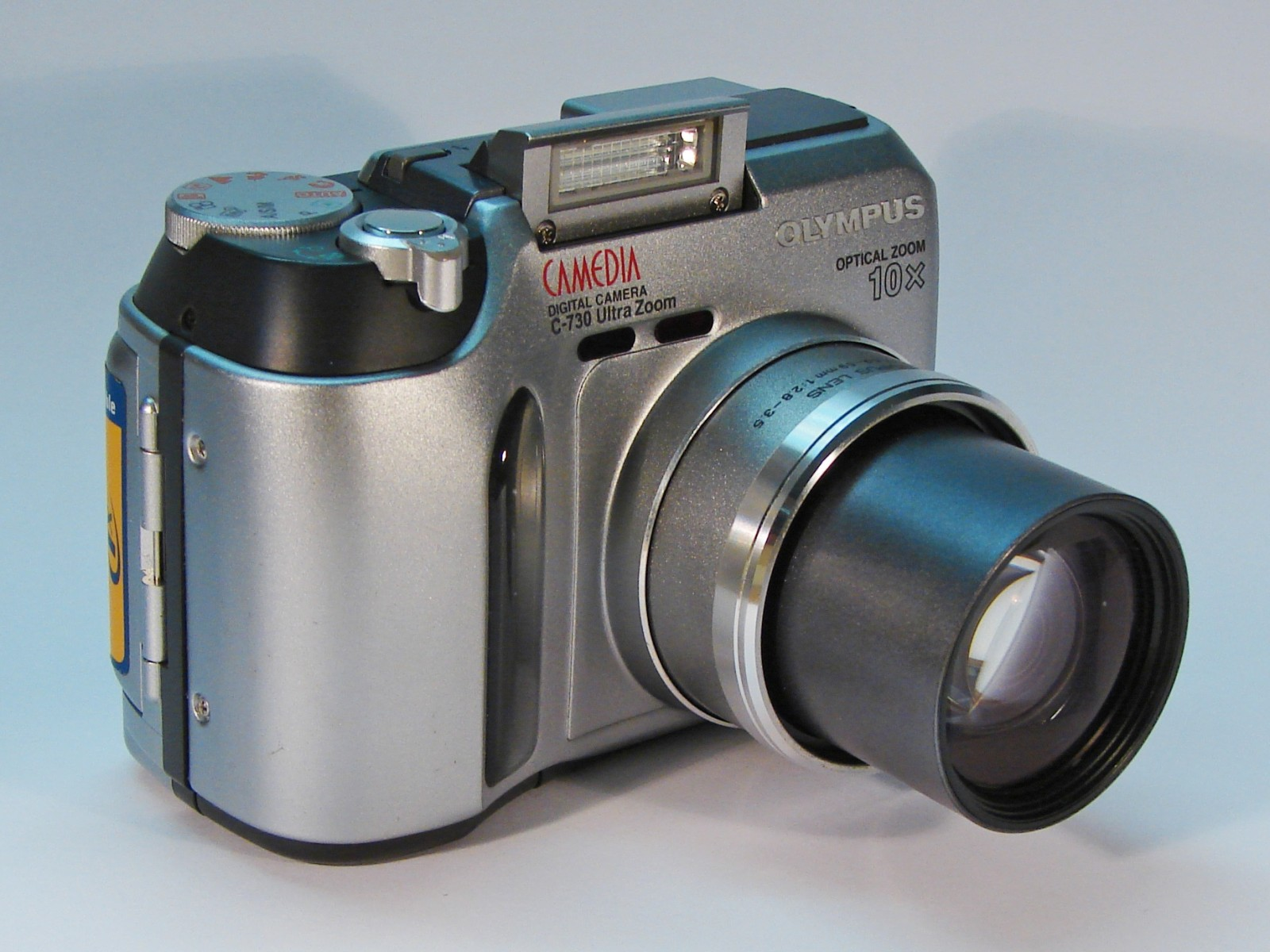

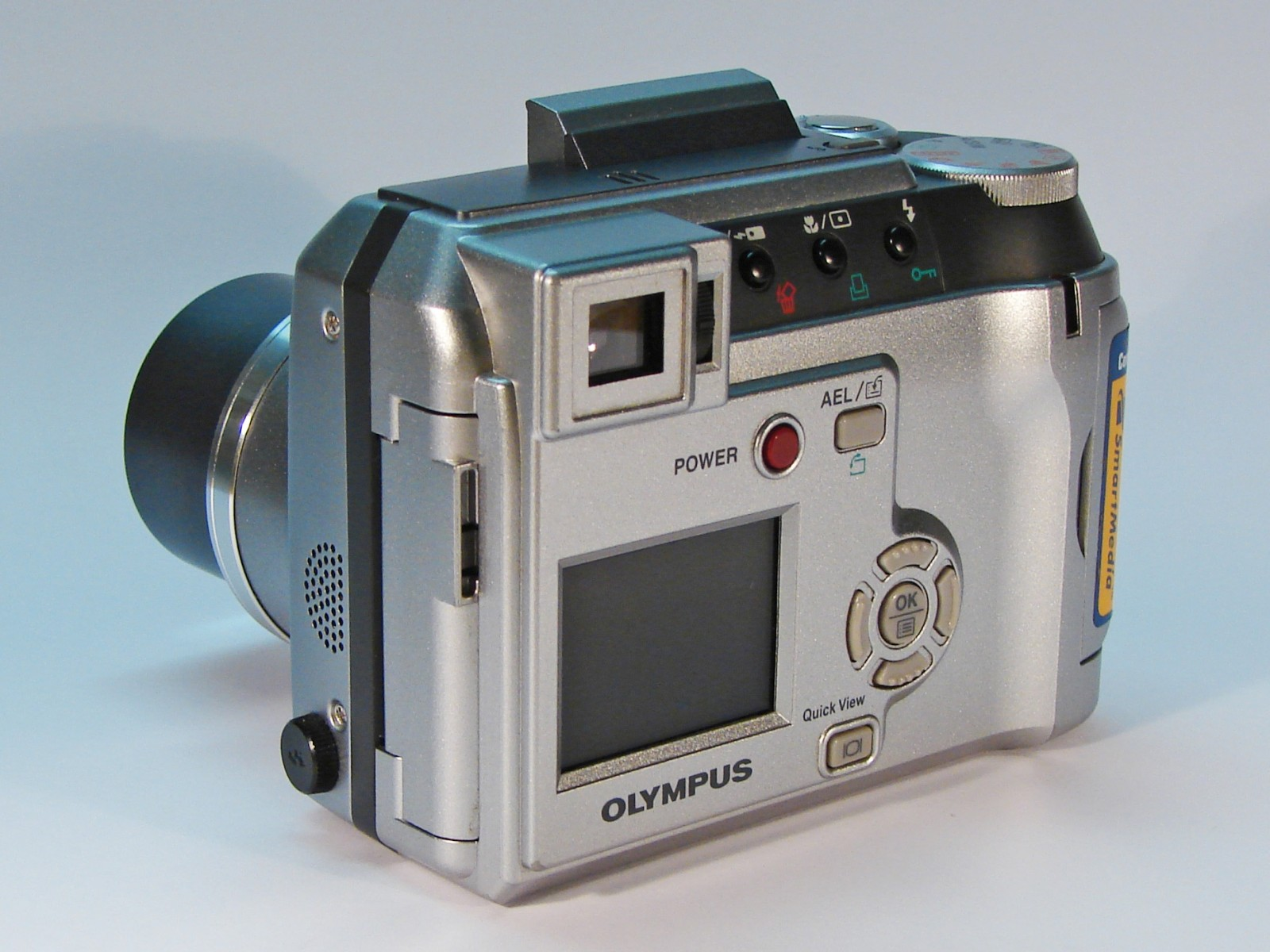

== Sample Images ==
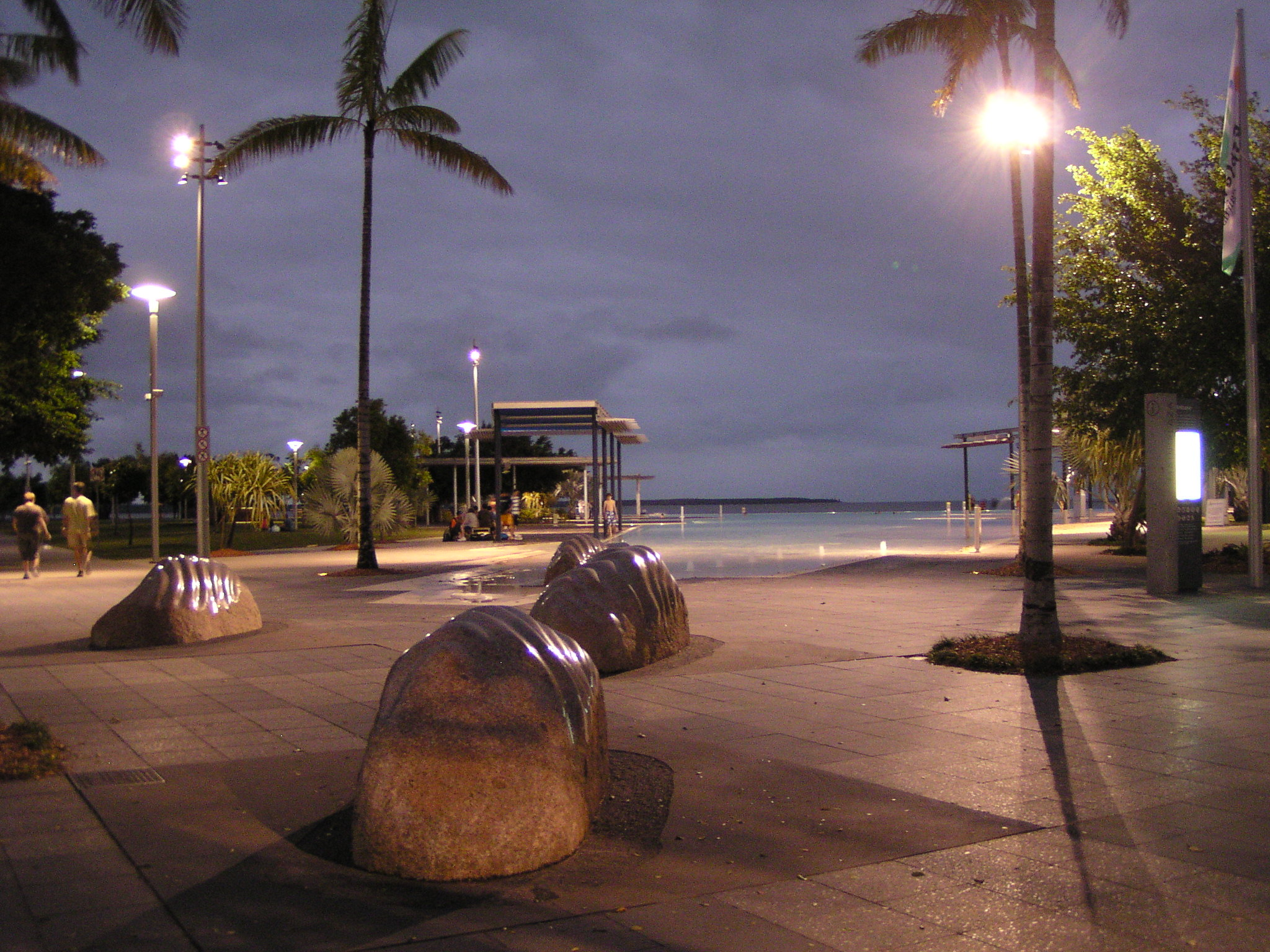
Evening photo

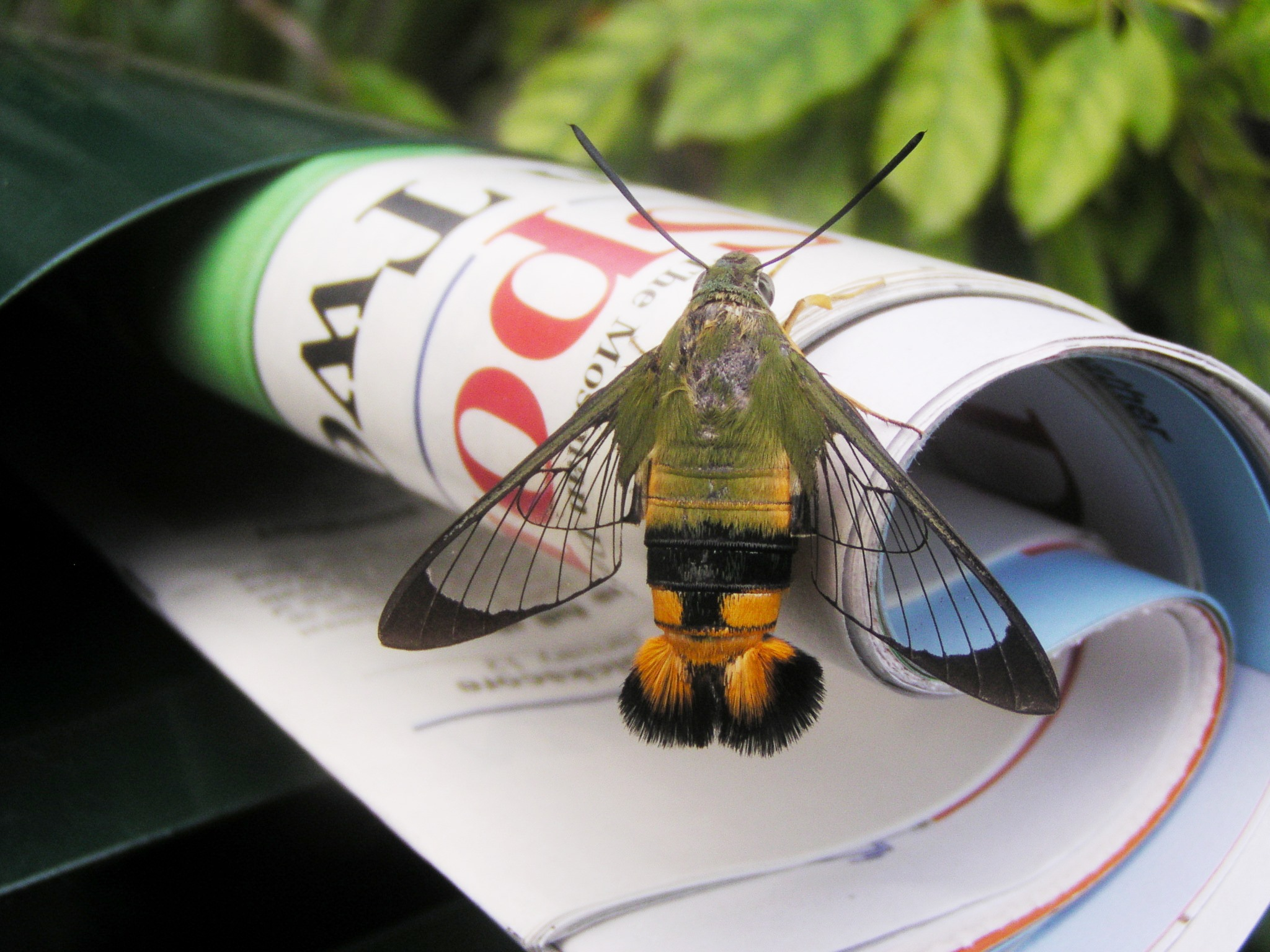
Close up

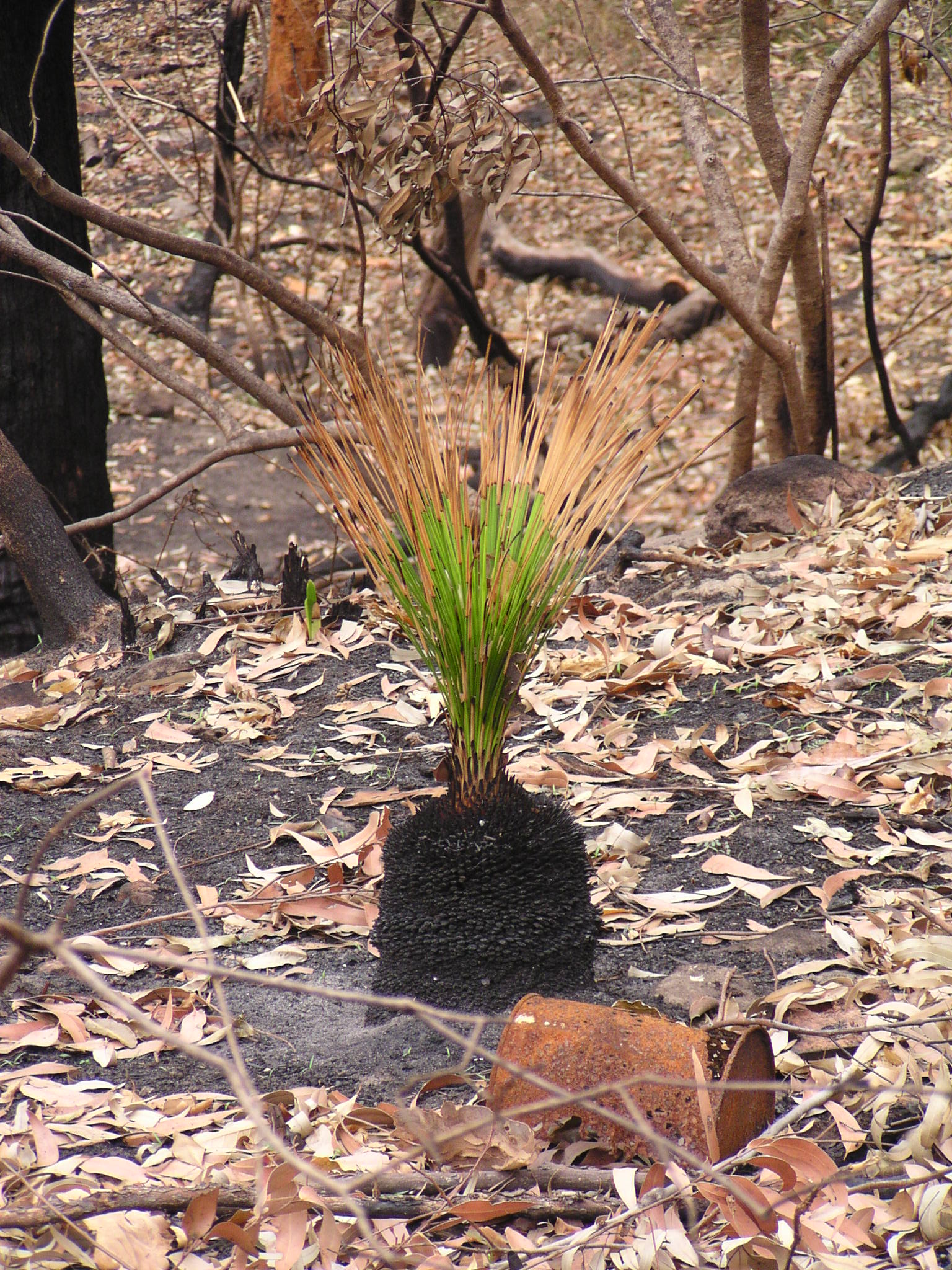
Daytime detail
