= Soft focus =

Lens flaw

Example using Canon EF 135 mm f/2.8 Soft Focus

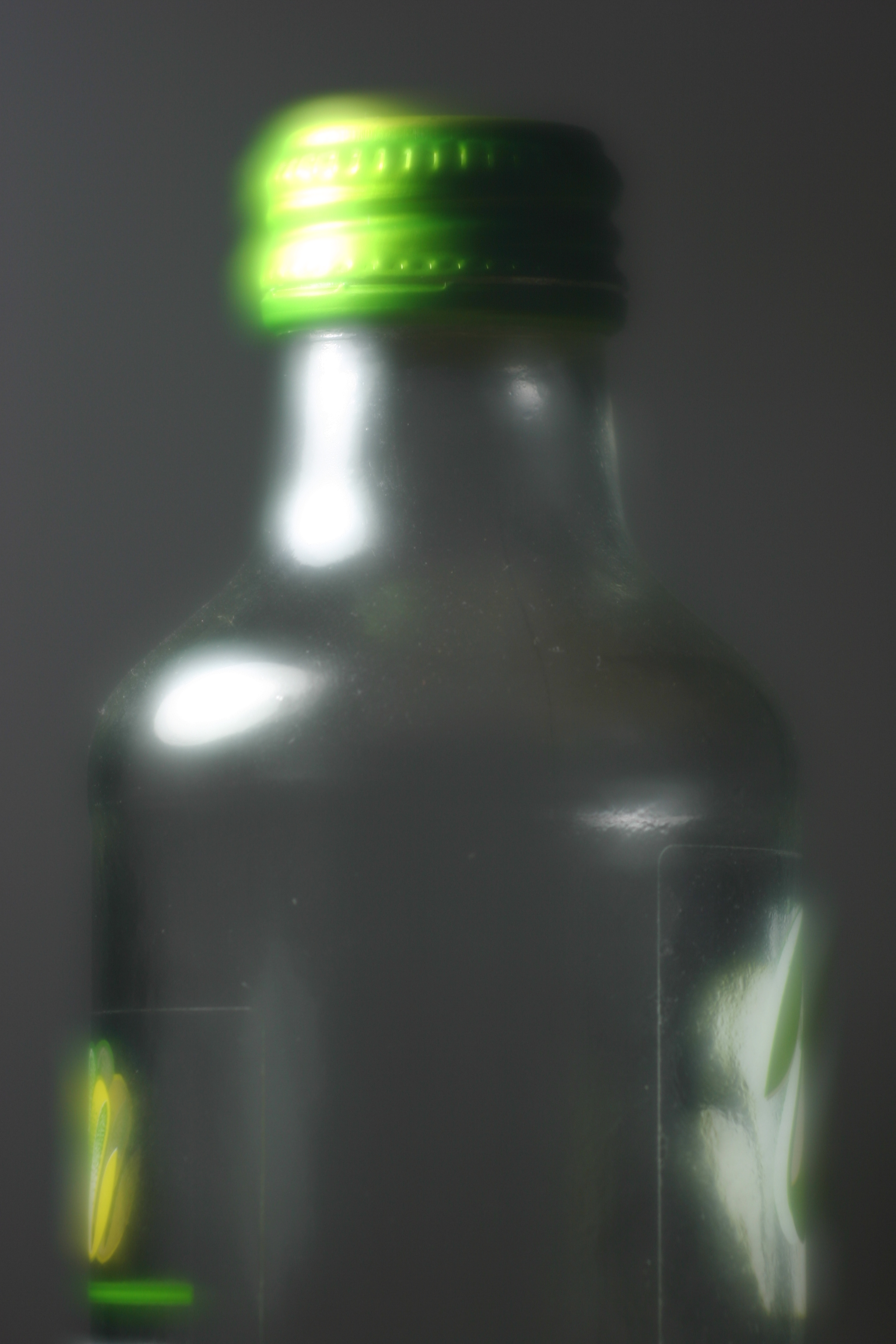
An image of a bottle with a heavy soft focus effect.

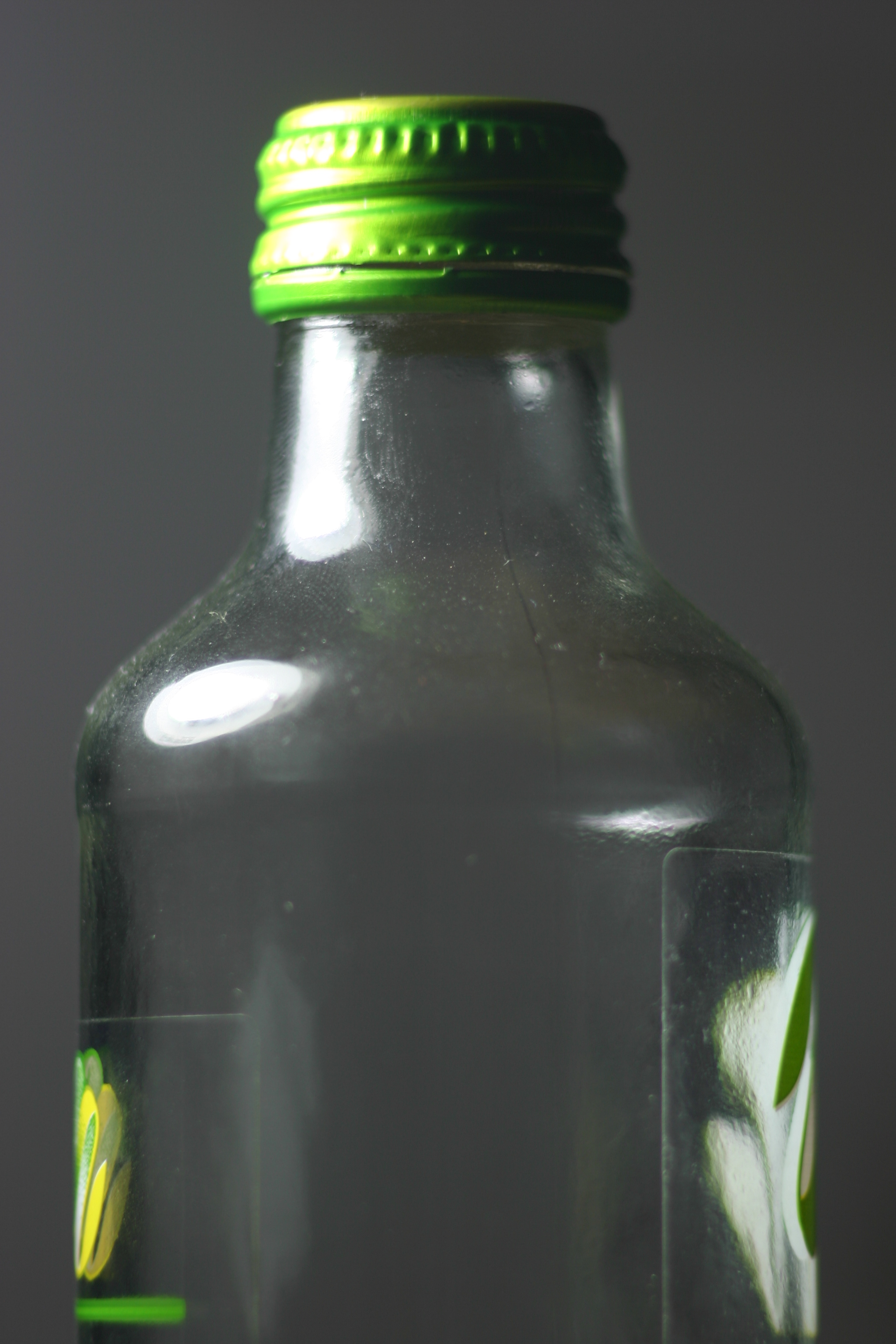
An image of the same bottle, but without soft focus.

In photography, soft focus occurs when a camera lens forms images that are blurred due to uncorrected spherical aberration. A soft focus lens deliberately introduces spherical aberration which blurs fine texture in the image while retaining sharp edges across areas of high contrast; it is not the same as an out-of-focus image, and the effect cannot be achieved simply by defocusing a sharp lens. Soft focus is also the name of the style of photograph produced by such a lens.

== Photography ==
=== Effect ===
Soft focus has been described as "an image that is in focus but has a halo of out-of-focus images around it." The first deliberate use of undercorrected spherical aberration, resulting in halos around highlights (also known as "pearly" highlights), is thought to have been by French pictorialists around 1900, spreading to the United States, where these lenses were most popular between 1910 and 1930. Noted practitioners of soft focus photography include Julia Margaret Cameron, Bob Guccione, and early Edward Weston, though Weston was later credited with moving photography away from soft focus pictorialism.

The soft focus effect is used primarily in glamour photography, because it eliminates blemishes. In general, soft focus photography produces a misty, dream-like image, sometimes characterized as romantic.

=== Technique ===
Special focusing techniques may be required to use a soft focus lens. For example, a front-focusing technique was suggested for the Kodak Portrait, in which the point of focus was placed closer to the camera than the actual subject. Unlike typical camera lenses, which have a generally symmetric depth of field characteristic extending both in front of and behind the point of focus, the uncorrected spherical aberration results in a depth of field which extends past (behind) the point of focus, but not in front.

Physically, the effect of a soft focus lens may be approximated by the use of diffusion filter or other method, such as stretching a nylon stocking over the front of the lens, or smearing petroleum jelly on a clear filter or on the front element or even the back element of the lens itself. The latter is less recommended because successive cleaning always introduces a risk to damage the lens's surface.

It can also be approximated with post-processing procedures, either during photographic printing or through digital manipulation. Specifically, highlights in an image are blurred, but the bokeh effects of soft focus cannot be reproduced.

=== Design ===
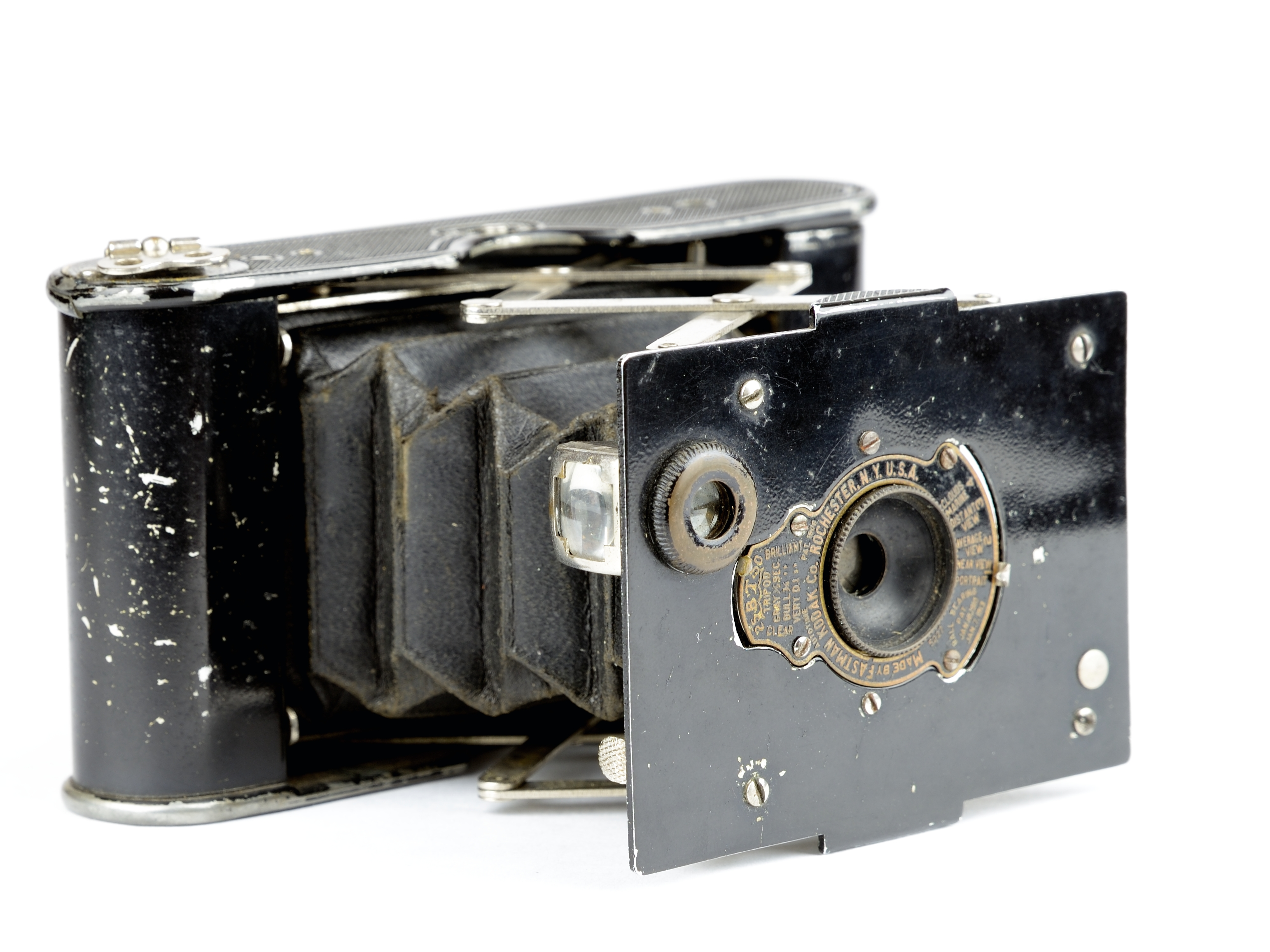
Vest Pocket Kodak with 2-element meniscus lens and integral hood

Because soft focus results from what are considered technical flaws, typically spherical and chromatic aberration, many older lenses had soft focus built in as a side effect of their construction. For example, the two-element cemented meniscus lens fitted to early Vest Pocket Kodak cameras had a dish-shaped hood which controlled spherical aberration by reducing the effective aperture to f/11; when the hood is removed, the resulting uncorrected images have a strong soft focus effect. After this modification, the lens enjoyed significant popularity in Japan during the 1970s, remounted to modern cameras. Photographers called this lens the Vestan (ベス単), referring to the camera's name and single-group lens construction, and the technique was championed by several Japanese photographers, including Shōji Ueda. The basic design of this lens was revived in 2016 as the Yasuhara MOMO 100.

Some lenses designed and sold during the heyday of soft focus lenses (c. 1910–1930), including the Pinkham & Smith Visual Quality series and Busch Nicola Perscheid, were designed intentionally to take advantage of these flaws. As color films became available, well-managed spherical aberration became more desirable than chromatic aberration.

Maximum (top) and minimum (bottom) spherical aberration configurations in a modern soft focus lens.

Newer lenses are optimized to minimize optical aberrations, but starting from the 1970s, manufacturers began releasing specialized contemporary lenses which are designed with adjustable levels of spherical aberration at wide apertures. The effect can be disabled entirely as well, in which case the lens is sharp. These modern soft focus lenses and their effect on the images should be considered distinct from the effect of lenses designed to render smooth bokeh using an apodization filter, such as the Minolta STF 135mm f/2.8 [T4.5].

As described in U.S. Patent 4,124,276, realized as the Minolta Varisoft Rokkor, a modern example with variable spherical aberration is a six-element, five-group lens which can be divided into three composite lens groups, marked A-I, A-II, and B. The first four elements (A-I, closest to the object being photographed) are moved as a unit to focus the lens, increasing the meniscus-shaped air gap between A-I and A-II as the lens is focused closer. The air gap distance between A-II and B is used to control spherical aberration; spherical aberration increases as the distance between A-II and B grows. In the patent summary, the inventors noted the object side lens group (A-I) was a Tessar design, although they added that any suitable lens would do, such as a Cooke triplet or Double Gauss lens; the preferred embodiment uses two meniscus lenses on the image side to control spherical aberration.

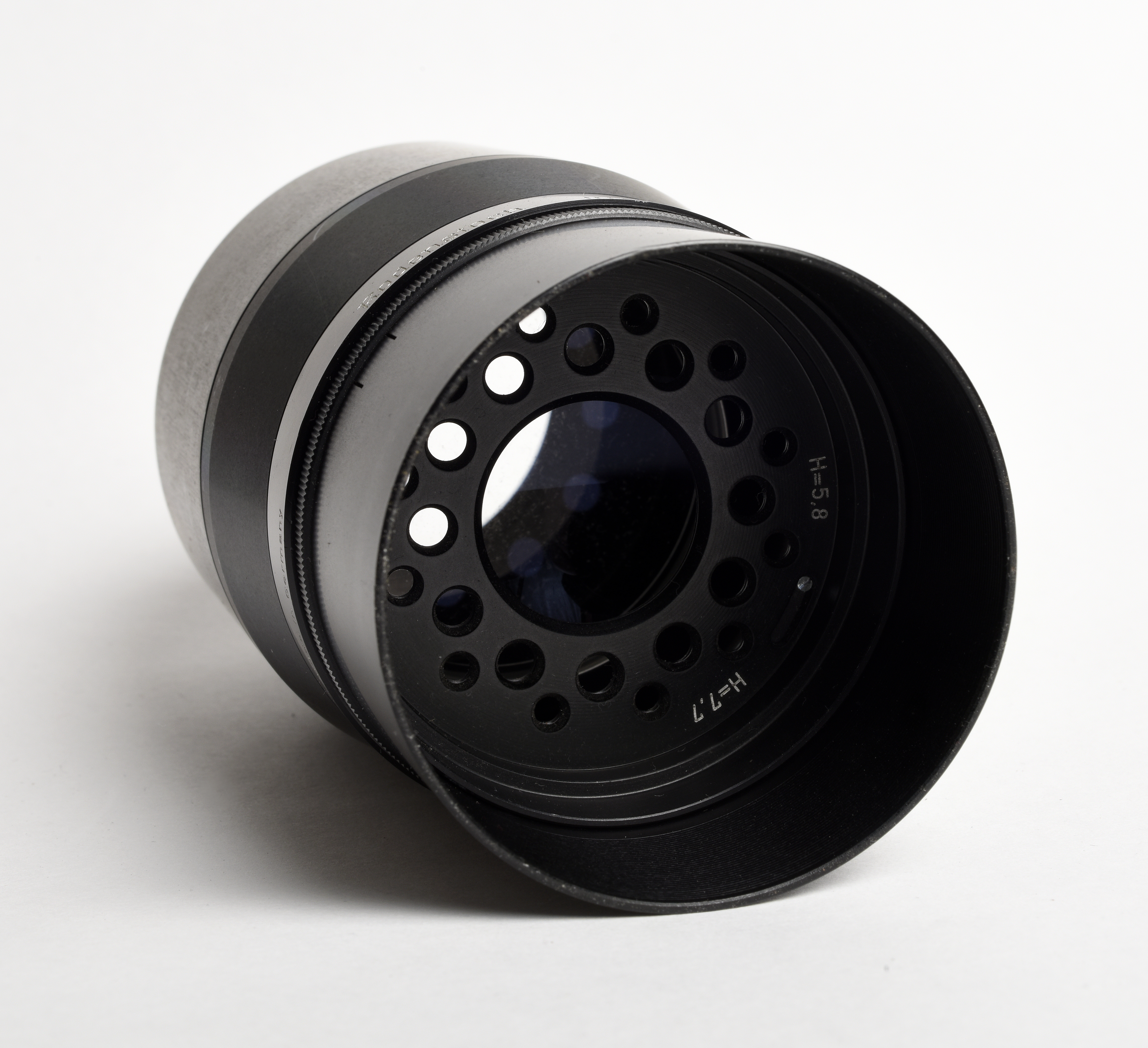
Imagon fitted with f/7.7-equivalent sieve aperture.

As an alternative to variable element spacing, some soft focus lenses such as the Rodenstock Imagon use interchangeable sieve aperture "grid" or "diffusion" discs which have a perforated annular shape to control the balance of light recorded between the relatively well-corrected center of the lens and the uncorrected periphery. As light from the periphery is restricted, the soft focus effect becomes less pronounced. Effective aperture values (for computing exposure) range from f/5.8 to f/11.5.

== Examples ==
Some examples of soft focus lenses, including modern (after 1950) lenses with controllable amounts of spherical aberration, include:

Selected soft focus lenses
Spec Lens			FL (mm)	Ap.	Intro.	Min. focus	Const.		Dimensions			Method (Note: Basic method of achieving soft focus effects: C (conventional aperture) The lens is undercorrected for spherical aberration when the diaphragm is fully open. A conventional iris diaphragm is closed to minimize spherical aberration. Typically, the soft focus effect is controlled directly by the aperture setting, and these lenses do not have a separate control for soft focus. S (sieve aperture) The lens is undercorrected for spherical aberration when the diaphragm is fully open. A sieve aperture (perforated annulus) is used to change the balance of image-forming light between the relatively well-corrected center of the lens and undercorrected periphery of the lens. Light from the periphery is suppressed to minimize spherical aberration. Typically, the soft focus effect is controlled by adding or removing a physical element to the lens to restrict or add light from the periphery. CS (conventional + sieve aperture) The lens is undercorrected for spherical aberration when the diaphragm is fully open. An internal sieve aperture (perforated annulus) is permanently fixed to set a default balance of image-forming light between the relatively well-corrected center of the lens and undercorrected periphery of the lens when the diaphragm is fully open. Typically, the soft focus effect is controlled by a conventional, adjustable iris diaphragm to restrict light from the periphery. When light from the periphery is suppressed, spherical aberration is minimized. V (variable element spacing) The lens is corrected for spherical aberration. An element or group of elements is moved relative to the rest of the elements to adjust the degree of spherical aberration correction. Typically, these lenses have a separate control for the soft focus effect to displace the corrective element(s). W (Waterhouse aperture) The lens is undercorrected for spherical aberration when the diaphragm is fully open. A Waterhouse stop is added to change spherical aberration, with the smallest diaphragm openings resulting in minimal spherical aberration. Typically, the soft focus effect is controlled by the aperture selected, and these lenses do not have a separate control for soft focus.)	Notes / Refs.
Mfr.	Name	Mount(s)	FL (mm)	Ap.	Intro.	Min. focus	Ele	Grp	Φ×L	Wgt.	Filter (mm)	Method	Notes / Refs.
Canon	New FD 85mm f/2.8 Soft Focus	FD	85	f/2.8–22	1983	0.8 m (31 in)	6	4	70×70 mm (2.8×2.8 in)	400 g (14 oz)	58	V	Sliding soft focus control
Canon	EF 135mm f/2.8 Soft Focus	EF	135	f/2.8–32	1987	1.3 m (51 in)	7	6	69.2×98.4 mm (2.7×3.9 in)	390 g (14 oz)	52	V	
Fujifilm	EBC Fujinon-SF 85mm f/4	M42	85	f/4–16	c. 1975	1 m (39 in)	4	4	63.5×64.5 mm (2.5×2.5 in)	285 g (10.1 oz)	49	CS	
Fujifilm	GX(M) SF 190mm f/8.0	GX680	190	f/8–64	1988	1.52 m (60 in)	3	3	101.0×107.0×104.0 mm (4.0×4.2×4.1 in)	690 g (24 oz)	82	CS	Discontinued 2011
Fujifilm	Fujinon-SF	#1	180	f/5.6–22	?	varies	3	3	48×42.5 mm (1.9×1.7 in)	240 g (8.5 oz)	46	CS	
Fujifilm	Fujinon-SF	#2/#3	250	f/5.6–22	?	varies	3	3	70×61 mm (2.8×2.4 in)	550 g (19 oz)	67	CS	
Fujifilm	Fujinon-SF	barrel	420	f/5.6–22	?	varies	3	3	85×77.5 mm (3.3×3.1 in)	980 g (35 oz)	82	CS	
Kenko	MC Soft 35mm F:4	T2	35	f/4–22	?	0.3 m (12 in)	?	?	?	?	52	C	
Kenko	べスタンSoft 45mm F:4.5	"P" (Note: The "P" mount uses same Φ42×1 mm thread mount as the M42 lens mount, but with an extended 55.0 mm flange-back distance instead of the 45.46 mm flange-back distance of M42; a short extension tube may be helpful.)	45	f/4.5–22	1995	0.35 m (14 in)	2	1	64×50 mm (2.5×2.0 in)	265 g (9.3 oz)	52	C	
Kenko	MC Soft 85mm F:2.5	"P"	85	f/2.5–8	1987	0.8 m (31 in)	3	3	66×76 mm (2.6×3.0 in)	315 g (11.1 oz)	52	C	
Kiyohara Optical	Kiyohara Soft VK50R	(multiple) (Note: Available as a manual focus lens with multiple camera system mounts, including EF, FD, NF, SR, A/α, OM, PK, C/Y, M42, AR, and LR.)	50	f/4.5–16	1987	0.45 m (18 in)	2	1	?	125 g (4.4 oz)	40.5	C	Designed by Takano Eiichi.
Kiyohara Optical	Kiyohara Soft VK70R	(multiple)	70	f/5–11	1986	0.6 m (24 in)	2	1	49×60 mm (1.9×2.4 in)	136 g (4.8 oz)	49	C	Designed by Eiichi Sakurai.
Lensbaby	Soft Focus Optic	(multiple) (Note: This is a lens unit that is inserted into a mechanical body, which Lensbaby calls the Optic Swap System (OSS). OSS lens units are compatible with the Lensbaby Composer, Composer Pro, Muse, Control Freak, Spark, and Scout mechanical bodies, which are available with multiple camera system mounts, including EF, NF, A/α, PK, E/NEX, 4/3, and μ4/3.)	50	f/2–22	2009	0.3–0.45 m (12–18 in)	2	1	49×34 mm (1.9×1.3 in)	?	—N/a	S	3 magnetic sieve aperture discs, f/3.3 and f/4.8 overall.
Lensbaby	Soft Focus II	(multiple)	50	f/2.5–22	2022	0.38 m (15 in)	2	1	?	?	46	CS	Internal diaphragm + magnetic sieve apertures
Lensbaby	Trio 28 ("Velvet" lens)	(multiple) (Note: Available as a manual focus lens with multiple camera system mounts, including EF, RF, NF, NZ, FX, and PK.)	28	f/3.5	2016	0.20 m (8 in)	3	2	70×51 mm (2.75×2 in)	140 g (4.9 oz)	46	C	Three effects in one lens body: "Twist" (swirly bokeh), "Velvet" (soft focus), and "Sweet" (limited focus)
Lensbaby	Velvet 28	(multiple)	28	f/2.5–22	2020	0.049 m (1.9 in)	8	7	?	?	67	C	
Lensbaby	Velvet 56	(multiple)	56	f/1.6–16	2015	0.130 m (5.1 in)	4	3	?	?	62	C	
Lensbaby	Velvet 85	(multiple)	85	f/1.8–16	2017	0.230 m (9.1 in)	4	3	?	?	67	C	
Mamiya-Sekor	SF C	M645	145	f/4.0–32	?	1.5 m (59 in)	7	5	81.5×116 mm (3.21×4.57 in)	900 g (32 oz)	77	V	
Mamiya-Sekor	SF C	RB67	150	f/4.0–32	?	0.61 m (24 in)	5	3	94×84 mm (3.7×3.3 in)	930 g (33 oz)	77	S	
Mamiya-Sekor	Soft M D/L	RZ67	180	f/4.0–32	?	1.05 m (41 in)	6	4	97.2×127 mm (3.83×5.00 in)	1,039 g (36.6 oz)	77	S	
Minolta	Varisoft Rokkor 85mm f/2.8	SR/ MC/ MD	85	f/2.8–16	1978	0.8 m (31 in)	6	5	70×80 mm (2.8×3.1 in)	430 g (15 oz)	55	V	
Minolta	AF 100mm f/2.8 SOFT FOCUS	A/α	100	f/2.8–32	1994	0.8 m (31 in)	7	7	71.5×78 mm (2.8×3.1 in)	440 g (16 oz)	55	V	
Nikon	Fuwatto Soft (ふわっと ソフト)	NF	90	f/4.8	1995	0.4 m (16 in)	2	1	60×112.5 mm (2.4×4.4 in)	300 g (11 oz)	52	W	Included in Amusing Lenses (1995) / Fun Fun LensSet (2000)
Pentax	SMC FA	PK(AF)	28	f/2.8–22	?	0.25 m (9.8 in)	5	5	65.6×40.3 mm (2.6×1.6 in)	191 g (6.7 oz)	49	C	
Pentax	SMC Soft	PK(A)	85	f/2.2–5.6	?	0.57 m (22 in)	2	1	72×51.5 mm (2.8×2.0 in)	235 g (8.3 oz)	49	C	
Pentax	SMC F Soft	PK(AF)	85	f/2.8–32	?	0.5 m (20 in)	5	4	66×60 mm (2.6×2.4 in)	385 g (13.6 oz)	52	C	
Pentax	SMC FA Soft	PK(AF)	85	f/2.8–32	?	0.5 m (20 in)	5	4	66×60 mm (2.6×2.4 in)	305 g (10.8 oz)	52	C	
Pentax	SMC 67 Soft	P67	120	f/4.5–22	?	0.75 m (30 in)	4	3	89×63.5 mm (3.5×2.5 in)	520 g (18 oz)	77	C	
Rodenstock	Imagon	#3 (typ. Φ=65.3 mm)	200	H 5.8–11.5	1926	varies	2	1	102×78 mm (4.0×3.1 in)	510 g (18 oz)	55 (slip-on)	S	Most commonly found in 200, 250, or 300mm, but 170, 360, 420, and 480mm exist.
Rodenstock	Imagon	#3 (typ. Φ=65.3 mm)	250	H 5.8–11.5	1926	varies	2	1	102×84.5 mm (4.0×3.3 in)	510 g (18 oz)	55 (slip-on)	S	Most commonly found in 200, 250, or 300mm, but 170, 360, 420, and 480mm exist.
Rodenstock	Imagon	#3 or #4	300	H 5.8–11.5	1926	varies	2	1	102×91 mm (4.0×3.6 in)	540 g (19 oz)	55 or 78 (slip-on)	S	Most commonly found in 200, 250, or 300mm, but 170, 360, 420, and 480mm exist.
Sima	Soft+Macro	T	100	f/2.0	1982	0.4 m (16 in)	1	1	60×147.3 mm (2.4×5.8 in)	156 g (5.5 oz)	?	W	Includes Waterhouse stops for f/4 and f/5.6 and 4×ND filter for exposure and creative control; focuses by pushing or pulling the lens.
Spiratone	Portragon	T	100	f/4.0	1976	0.98 m (3.2 ft)	1	1	?	140 g (5 oz)	?	—N/a	Helicoid focus, fixed aperture
Tamron	SP 70–150mm Soft	(multiple) (Note: This is a Tamron Adaptall-2 lens; mount adapters are available for C, FD, C/Y, AR, M42, NF, OM, PK, QBM, SR, Topcon/Exakta and others, retaining autoexposure and auto-diaphragm lens couplings.)	70–150	f/2.8–32	1979	0.98 m (39 in)	14	10	67.5×151.5 mm (2.7×6.0 in)	760 g (27 oz)	62	V	Only known soft focus zoom lens.
Yasuhara	MoMo 100	EF, NF	43	f/6.4	2016	0.5 m (20 in)	2	2	65×28 mm (2.6×1.1 in)	145 g (5.1 oz)	37	C	Two versions, designed to approximate a "normal" focal length for both full-frame and cropped sensors.
Yasuhara	MoMo 100	E/NEX, FX, μ43	28	f/6.4	2016	0.3 m (12 in)	2	2	61×36 mm (2.4×1.4 in)	139 g (4.9 oz)	37	C	Two versions, designed to approximate a "normal" focal length for both full-frame and cropped sensors.

Notes

- Kodak Portrait (4×5+)
- Leica Thambar 90mm f/2.2 (M39)
- Petzval portrait (4×5+)
- Seibold Dreamagon 90mm f/4
- Wollensak Veritar (4×5+)

=== Thambar ===
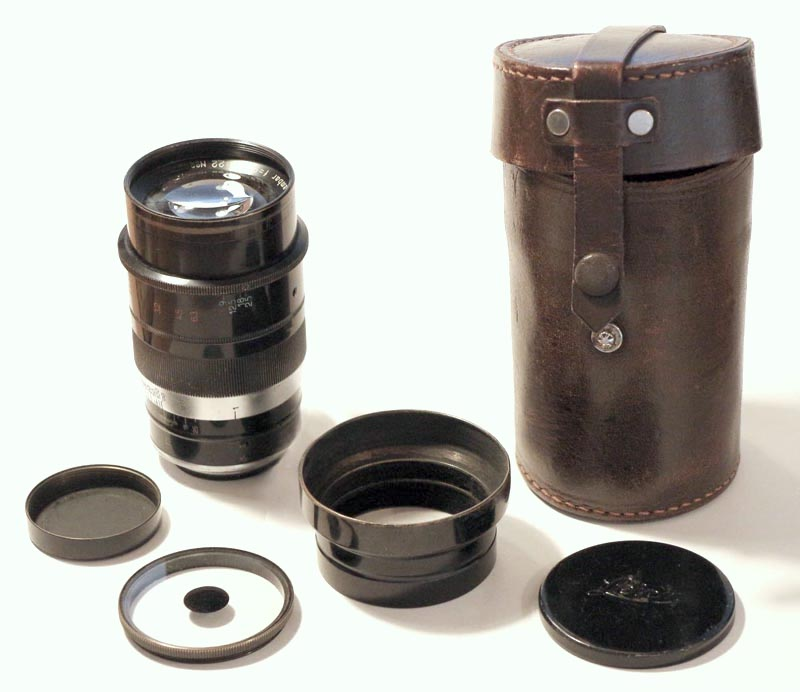
Very rare Leica soft-focus Thambar lens from the 1930s with original leather case. In front, left to right: Rear cap, special dot filter, lens shade, front cap.

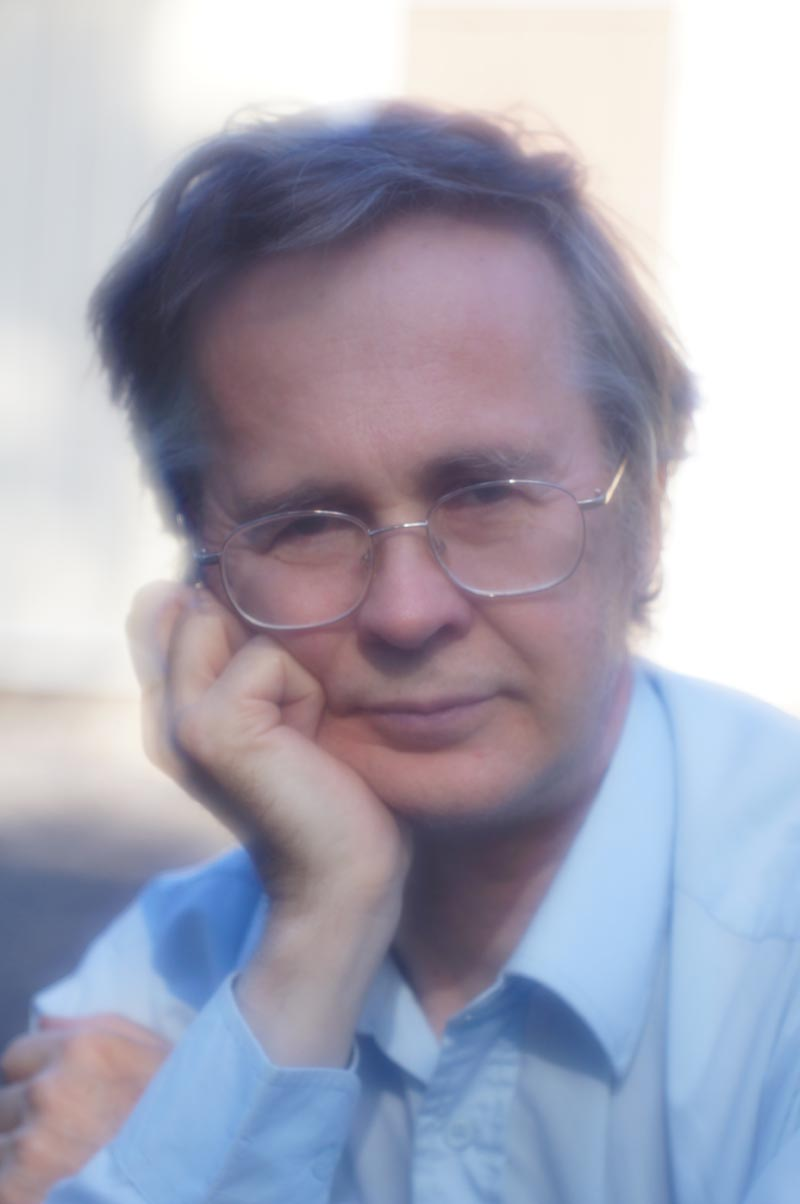
A portrait taken with a Leica Thambar soft-focus lens

In 1935, Leitz released a soft-focus lens, the Thambar 90mm f/2.2, for the Leica rangefinder cameras. It was supplied with a special filter to block light through the center of the lens, resulting in the image being formed by relatively uncorrected aberrations through the periphery. It was made in small numbers, no more than 3000 units, and is a rare collector's item today.

== See also ==
- Rodenstock Imagon
- Seibold's Dreamagon
- Aberration in optical systems
- Lens (optics)
- Special effect
- Bokeh
- Convolution
- Depth of field
- Low-pass filter
- Gaussian blur
