= Rodenstock Photo Optics =

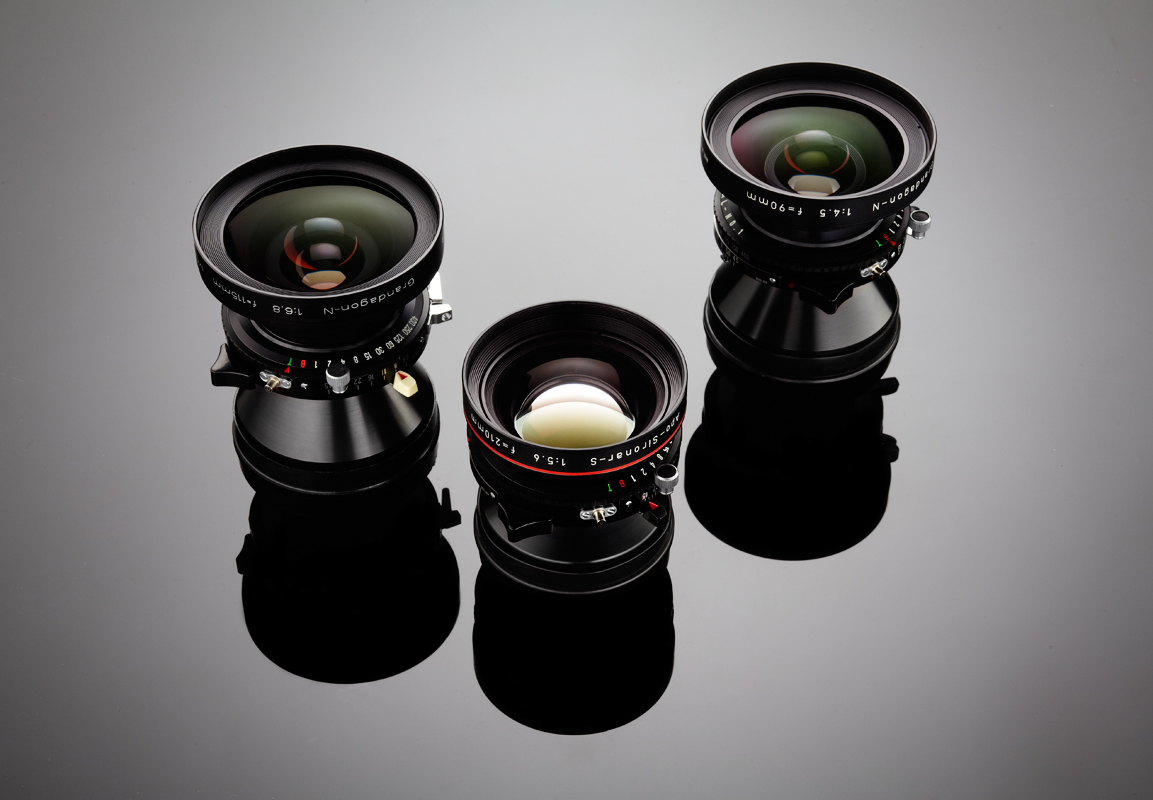
Rodenstock lenses for large-format cameras; L–R: Grandagon-N 115 mm f/6.8, Apo-Sironar-S 210 mm f/5.6, Grandagon-N 90 mm f/4.5

Rodenstock Photo Optics traces its origins to a mechanical workshop founded in 1877 by Josef Rodenstock and his brother Michael in Würzburg, Germany. The company relocated to Munich by 1884 and became an important manufacturer of both corrective lenses for glasses and camera lenses by the early 1900s. These two lines began to diverge in the 1960s as the center of photographic lens manufacturing shifted to Japan; the ophthalmic business continued as Rodenstock GmbH while the remaining camera lens business was repositioned to serve the large format and industrial precision optics markets, then spun off in 1996 as Rodenstock Präzisionsoptik. Since then, the precision optics brand has been acquired in succession by LINOS Photonics (Göttingen, 2000), Qioptiq Group (Luxembourg, 2006), and Excelitas Technologies (2013).

Photographic lenses produced by Rodenstock during and since the 20th century include the brands Ysarex, Heligon, Eurygon, Rotelar, Apo-Ronar, Rodagon, and Grandagon for many different lens mounts including M42, Deckel, and large format lens boards.

== Corporate history ==
Rodenstock pivoted to professional photography and enlarging optics markets in the 1970s.

== Products ==
=== Photographic lenses ===
Photographic lenses were sold initially with the G. Rodenstock brand. A 1912 catalog lists Eurynar double-anastigmat lenses with focal lengths ranging from 3 1/2 in (89 mm) to 19 in (480 mm) for various formats with maximum apertures of f/6.8; similar Eurynar lenses were offered with maximum apertures of f/5.4 and f/4.5. These featured a symmetric four-element, four-group design and an angle of view of approximately 90°. At the time, Rodenstock also offered the Pantogonal wide-angle lens, expanding the field of view to 125–130° with a maximum aperture of f/18, and a telephoto attachment for the Eurynar. The Pantogonal has a symmetric two-element design similar to the Goerz Hypergon.

In the 1920s, Heinrich Kühn and Franz Staeble designed the two-element Anachromat Kühn soft-focus lens, which was licensed by Rodenstock and marketed as the Tiefenbildner-Imagon from 1928. The Imagon remained in the lineup for decades.

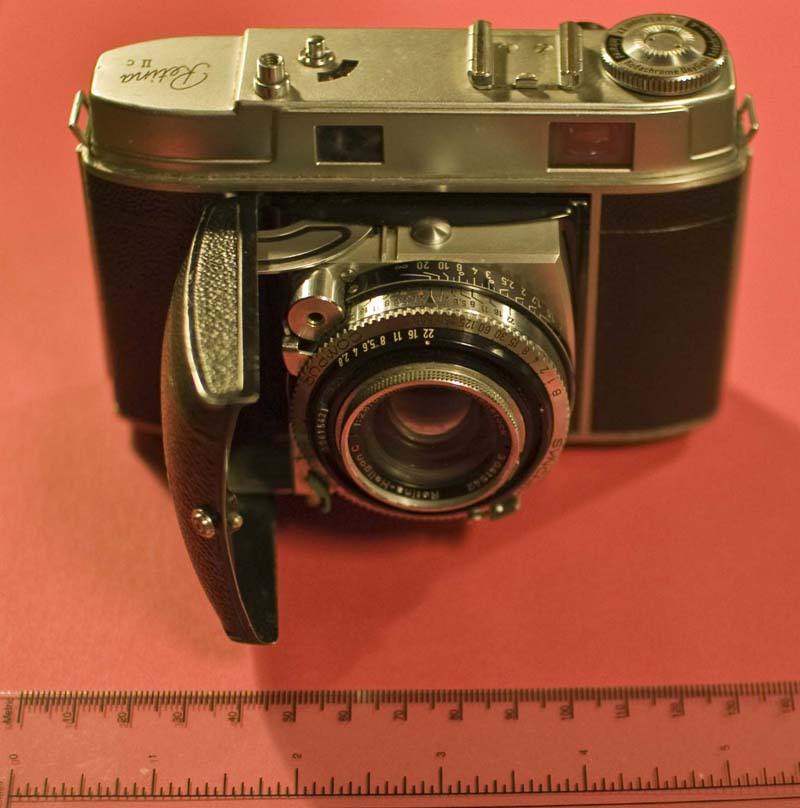
Kodak Retina IIC with Rodenstock Retina-Heligon lens

Rodenstock was one of the primary brands supplying lenses for the Kodak Retina line of fixed- and interchangeable-lens 35 mm cameras after World War II, alongside Schneider Kreuznach and Kodak. At about the same time in the mid- to late-1950s, Rodenstock was supplying lenses to Carl Braun Camera-Werk (for the Colorette Super II and Paxette Reflex) and Iloca (for the Electric). Rodenstock offered retrofocus/inverted telephoto wide-angle lenses (Eurygon, Eurynar, and Heligaron), Tessar-type normal lenses (Ysarex), and Sonnar-type telephoto lenses (Rotelar).

By 1963, Rodenstock had returned to supplying the large format professional photography market, offering Ysarex (Tessar-type, four-element/three-group [4e/3g]) and Heligon (double Gauss high-speed) normal lenses, Grandagon (Biogon-type, eight-element/four-group [8e/4g]) wide-angle lenses, Rotelar telephoto lenses, Imagon [2e/1g] soft-focus lenses, and Apo-Ronar [symmetric 4e/4g] process/macro lenses, optimized for 1:1 reproduction. In addition, Rodenstock was producing Omegaron lenses for enlargers. The Ysarex and Heligon were consolidated into the Sironar line, a symmetric [6e/4g] double-Gauss design, and the Rotelar had been dropped by the 1970s. The Geronar line [3e/3g] was introduced as a lower-priced alternative to the Sironar in the late 1970s or early 1980s.

The Sironar line was reformulated and updated with newer low-dispersion glass chemistry to improve resolution and add compatibility with digital camera backs and at Photokina 2010, Rodenstock unveiled their Digaron line of lenses, designed to cover the smaller sensors in digital backs.
