= Nikon F-mount teleconverter =

Family of camera lenses

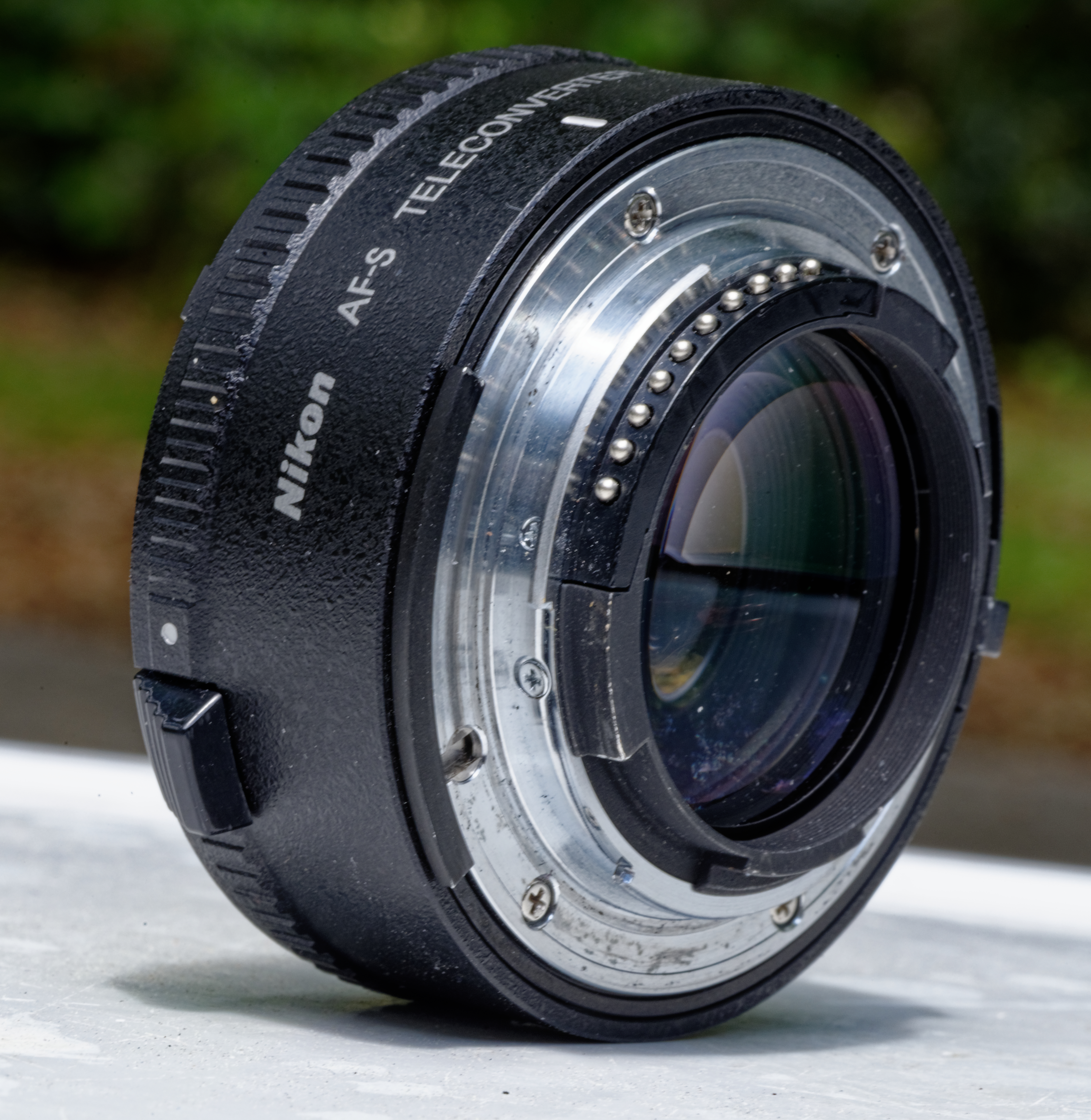
AF-S Teleconverter TC-14E II

The Nikon F-mount teleconverters are a group of magnifying lenses mounted between the lens and camera bodies using the Nikon F-mount. The 1.4×, 1.7× and 2× converters are available separately; a fourth, the 1.25×, is available only with Nikon's newest 800mm supertelephoto lens.

== Function ==
There are several generations, the newest are the E-II and the latest E-III series, which includes an aspherical lens.

Teleconverters need a fast lens for fast, reliable autofocus. Depending on brightness, contrast and needed autofocus-speed, one should have a minimum total aperture between f/11 and f/5.6. A total aperture of f/8 corresponds to a lens aperture of f/5.6, f/4 and f/2.8 with a 1.4×, 2× and 3× teleconverter, respectively. Sometimes teleconverters do not convert aperture and focal length data included in the Exif information, even if the actual focus and exposure still will be correct. Not every teleconverter will support autofocus with every lens. Teleconverters are often recommended only for lenses with minimum telephoto focal length or equivalent zoom range. All AF-I and AF-S teleconverters support lenses with optical image stabilization (Nikon VR).

== Models ==
Nikon F-mount teleconverters
Name	Compatible mount(s)	Const.	Diam. × Len.	Weight	Notes
1.25× teleconverters
TC800-1.25E ED	AF-G (AF-S Nikkor 800mm f/5.6E)	5e/3g	62.5×16 mm (2.5×0.6 in)	135 g (4.8 oz)	Dedicated teleconverter.
1.4× teleconverters
TC-14	AI	5e/5g	65×33.5 mm (2.6×1.3 in)	165 g (5.8 oz)	For longer focal lengths ≥300 mm.
TC-14A	AI, AI-S	5e/5g	65×25.5 mm (2.6×1.0 in)	145 g (5.1 oz)	For shorter focal lengths ≤200 mm.
TC-14B	AI, AI-S	5e/5g	65×34 mm (2.6×1.3 in)	165 g (5.8 oz)	For longer focal lengths ≥300 mm.
TC-14C	AI, AI-S	5e/5g	65×35.5 mm (2.6×1.4 in)	200 g (7.1 oz)	Dedicated for 300 mm f/2S IF-ED.
TC-14E	AF-D (AF-S and AF-I lenses)	5e/5g	66×24.5 mm (2.6×1.0 in)	200 g (7.1 oz)	
TC-14E II	AF-D (AF-S and AF-I lenses)	5e/5g	66×24.5 mm (2.6×1.0 in)	200 g (7.1 oz)	
TC-14E III	AF-G (AF-S lenses)	7e/4g	64×25 mm (2.5×1.0 in)	190 g (6.7 oz)	
TC-1.4	AF-G (AF-S Nikkor 180-400mm f/4E)	8e/5g	—N/a	—N/a	Integrated teleconverter.
1.6× teleconverters
TC-16	AI-S (F3AF)	5e/5g	88×21 mm (3.5×0.8 in)	285 g (10.1 oz)	Exclusive to F3AF, enables limited autofocus with manual focus lenses.
TC-16A	AI-S	5e/5g	67×21 mm (2.6×0.8 in)	150 g (5.3 oz)	Redesigned for AF cameras; enables limited autofocus with manual focus lenses.
1.7× teleconverters
TC-17E II	AF-D (AF-S and AF-I lenses)	7e/4g	66×31.5 mm (2.6×1.2 in)	250 g (8.8 oz)	
2.0× teleconverters
TC-1	non-AI	7e/5g	65×57.4 mm (2.6×2.3 in)	220 g (7.8 oz)	For focal lengths ≤200 mm.
TC-200	AI	7e/5g	64.5×52.5 mm (2.5×2.1 in)	230 g (8.1 oz)	For focal lengths ≤200 mm.
TC-201	AI, AI-S	7e/5g	64.5×52 mm (2.5×2.0 in)	230 g (8.1 oz)	For focal lengths ≤200 mm.
TC-2	non-AI	5e/5g	65×115 mm (2.6×4.5 in)	290 g (10 oz)	For focal lengths ≥300 mm.
TC-300	AI	5e/5g	64.5×115 mm (2.5×4.5 in)	300 g (11 oz)	For focal lengths ≥300 mm.
TC-301	AI, AI-S	5e/5g	64.5×115 mm (2.5×4.5 in)	280 g (9.9 oz)	For focal lengths ≥300 mm.
TC-20E	AF-D (AF-S and AF-I lenses)	7e/6g	66×55 mm (2.6×2.2 in)	355 g (12.5 oz)	
TC-20E II	AF-D (AF-S and AF-I lenses)	7e/6g	66×55 mm (2.6×2.2 in)	355 g (12.5 oz)	
TC-20E III	AF-G (AF-S lenses)	7e/5g	66×48 mm (2.6×1.9 in)	330 g (12 oz)	

== Compatibility information ==
Nikon AF-S and AF-I teleconverters will only mount original Nikon Nikkor AF-S and AF-I lenses (without modification). Modification needs removal of a small part. They are not recommended for use with Nikon DX format lenses although it mounts (with modification).

Although not recommended, F-mount teleconverters can be used in the Nikon 1 series with the FT1 mount adapter for extreme telephotos.

On a Nikon Z-mount camera using an FTZ II (or FTZ) mount adapter, Nikon F-mount teleconverters can be used with lenses that support the teleconverters and that are compatible F-mount lenses.

== See also ==
- Kenko (company)
- Canon Extender EF
- List of Nikon F-mount lenses with integrated autofocus motors
