= Contax/Yashica SLRs =

Line of cameras by Yashica and Contax

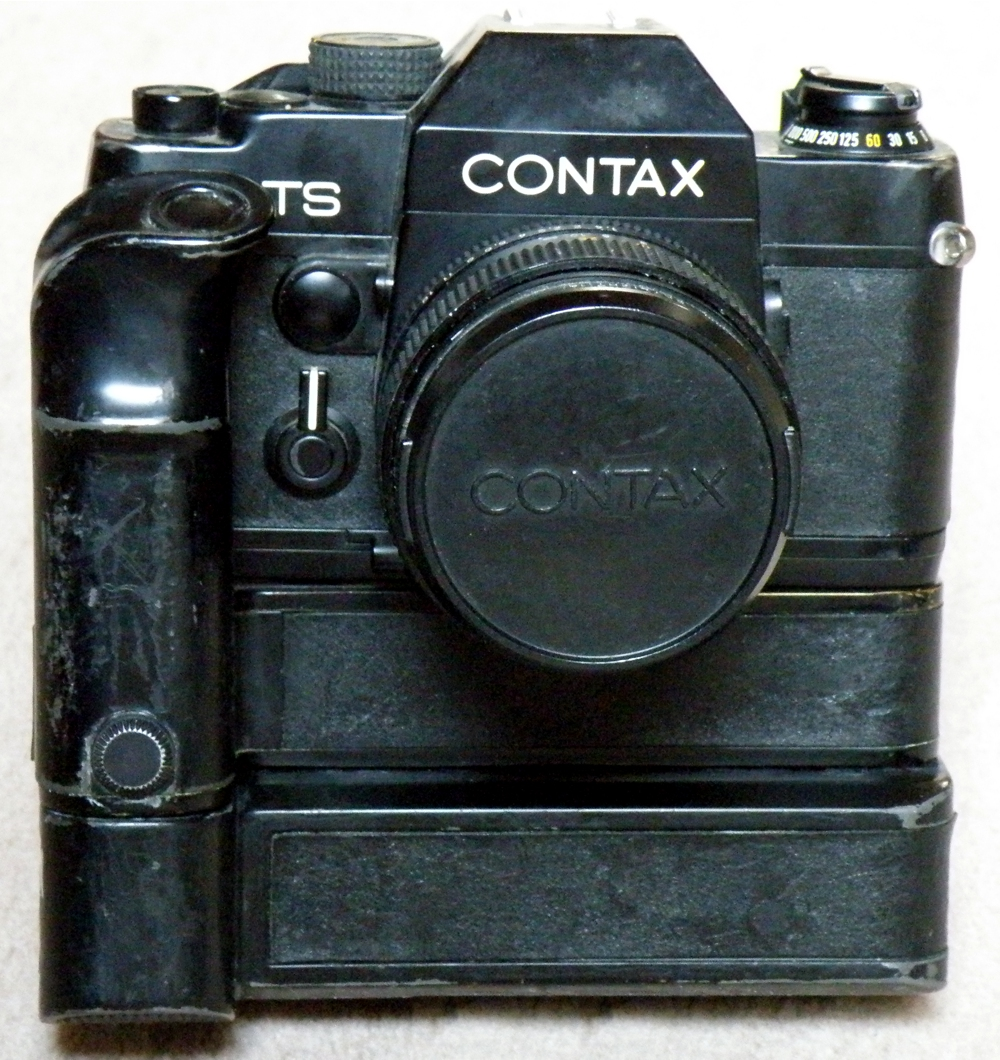
Contax RTS with Pro Motor Drive

The line of Contax/Yashica single lens reflex cameras was manufactured and sold by Japanese camera company Yashica, designed in cooperation with European partners Carl Zeiss AG and Porsche Design. SLR cameras were built both with the revived Contax name as well as Yashica; these cameras were sold from 1975 until 2005 when Kyocera, which had acquired Yashica in 1983, exited the photography business. Both Contax and Yashica-branded SLRs used a common Contax/Yashica (C/Y) bayonet lens mount; first-party C/Y-mount lenses were sold under both the Yashica and Carl Zeiss brands.

== History ==
=== First generation, featuring the Real Time System ===
In 1973, Yashica began Top Secret Project 130, a collaboration with Carl Zeiss that resulted the Contax RTS (for "real time system"), a new, professional 35 mm SLR system featuring an electronically-controlled shutter, using the revived Contax branding (styled in all caps as CONTAX). The preceding Contax line of rangefinder cameras had ceased production more than a decade before. The Contax RTS was designed by Prof. Dr. Katsuiko Sugaya, styled and evaluated for ergonmics by the Porsche Design studio, and manufactured by Yashica. The new camera was introduced at photokina 1974, and became a commercial success, aimed at the professional / system market. Featuring comprehensive use of electronics, it was the first of a new Contax line of SLR cameras which eventually included 13 different models; all used electronically-controlled shutters with the exception of the S2 and S2b (named as a spiritual successor to the original Dresden-built camera) being fully mechanical.

Yashica soon introduced several new SLRs with the same basic mechanics, including the FX-1 (1975) and FX-2 (1976). Also in that year, in response to the success of the Contax RTS, Yashica developed the upscale Yashica FR using some of the features of the RTS, including its electromagnetic shutter release. The FR was capable of using the entire range of Carl Zeiss T* lenses. In contemporaneous tests, the FR was described as being tougher in some ways than the more expensive Contax RTS, including better sealing against dust and contaminants. This practice of "pairing" similar Contax models with more affordable, less full-featured, but still high-quality Yashica models would continue for the next ten years. The FR was quickly followed in April 1977 by the FR-I and FR-II. The FR-I was a 35 mm SLR offering even more features compared to the RTS, including an electronic shutter with both manual and aperture priority modes, and marked the high point for the Yashica brand in competing with Nikon, Canon, and Minolta for the semi-professional SLR camera market.

Contax/Yashica-mount SLRs (first generation, electronic shutter control)
Camera Feature		CONTAX	YASHICA				
Camera Feature		RTS	FX-1	FX-2	FR	FR-I	FR-II
Year		1975		1976		1977	
Shutter	Timing / Release (Note: The following abbreviations are used: (E)lectronically-timed shutter; (Q)uartz-timed shutter; (M)echanically-timed shutter; (EM) Electromagnetic release; (MK) Mechanical release)	E/EM	E/MK		E/EM		
Shutter	Speeds	B+4–1/2000, stepless in AE	B+1–1/1000 (stepless to 2 s in AE)	B+1–1/1000		B+1–1/1000 (stepless to 2 s in AE)	B+4–1/1000, stepless
Shutter	Material	cloth					
Shutter	Travel	Horiz.					
Film transport		Manual, optional winder (2 fps) and motor drive (5 fps) units	Manual		Manual, optional winder (2 fps)		
Meter	Sensor (Note: CdS or SPD (silicon photodiode))	SPD	CdS			SPD	
Meter	Range (EV)	-1 to +19	0 to +18	+2 to +18	+1 to +18		
Meter	Modes (Note: Exposure modes include: (M)anual; (A)perture-priority autoexposure; (S)hutter-priority autoexposure; (P)rogram autoexposure; (TTL) flash)	M,A		M		M,A	A
Size	Dims. (W×H×D) (Note: Body-only, unless otherwise noted)	142×89.5×50 mm (5.6×3.5×2.0 in)	145×94×51 mm (5.7×3.7×2.0 in)	144.5×94×51 mm (5.7×3.7×2.0 in)	142.5×87×51 mm (5.6×3.4×2.0 in)		
Size	Wgt.	700 g (24.7 oz)	695 g (24.5 oz)	690 g (24.3 oz)	650 g (22.9 oz)	660 g (23.3 oz)	650 g (22.9 oz)

=== Second generation: mechanical and quartz options ===
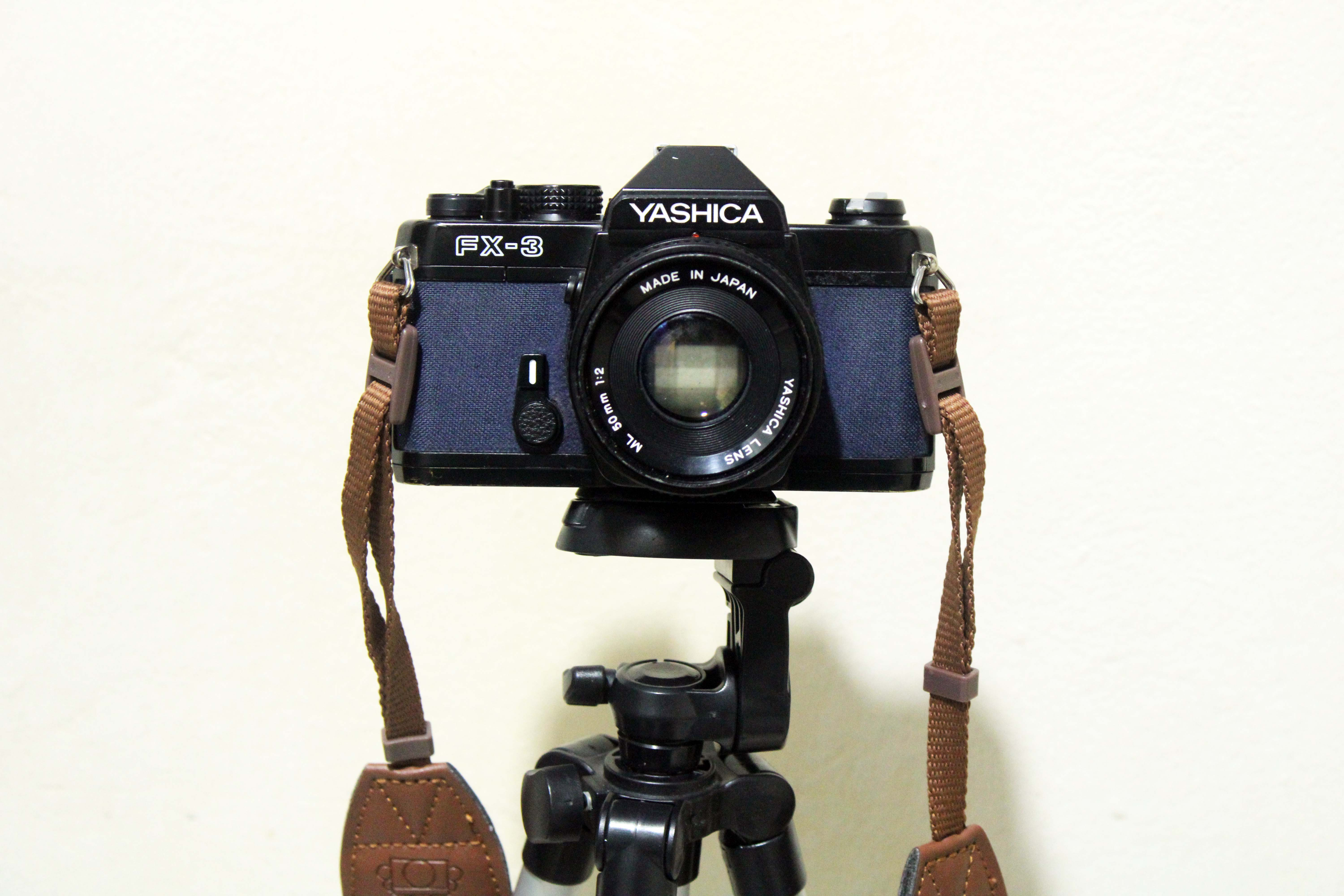
A blue edition of the Yashica FX-3

In 1979, Yashica introduced a new inexpensive 35 mm consumer SLR, the FX-3, intended for entry-level buyers. Designed and manufactured to Yashica specifications by Cosina, the affordable FX-3 still incorporated the C/Y lens mount that would also accept Carl Zeiss T* lenses. This simple, lightweight manual-exposure SLR camera sold well, and with minor revisions, stayed in production until 2002. Additional variations of the FX-3 included the FX-3 Super (1984, adding a flash ready light), FX-3 Super 2000 (1986, adding a 1/2000 s shutter speed), and the FX-7 (bundled with a zoom lens), which also had Super and Super 2000 variants.

Yashica would later release two mechanical shutter Contax cameras as well, the S2 (1992) and S2b (1994), differing in the metering pattern. The S2 and S2b were deliberately designed without exposure automation, and required a battery only for the light metering system. The S2 has a spot meter, and was popular with some Zone System photographers, while the S2b has a centerweighted meter favored by some photojournalists.

Contax/Yashica-mount SLRs (manual exposure, mechanical shutter)
Camera Feature		YASHICA			CONTAX	
Camera Feature		FX-3 / FX-7	FX-3 Super / FX-7 Super	FX-3 Super 2000 / FX-7 Super 2000	S2	S2b
Year		1979	1984	1986	1992	1994
Shutter	Timing / Release	M/MK				
Shutter	Speeds	B+1-1/1000		B+1-1/2000	B+1-1/4000	
Shutter	Material	metal				
Shutter	Travel	Vert.				
Film transport		Manual				
Meter	Sensor	SPD				
Meter	Range (EV)	+2 to +18		+2 to +19	+2 to +20	
Meter	Modes	M				
Size	Dims. (W×H×D)	135×84.5×50 mm (5.3×3.3×2.0 in)		134.6×83.8×50.8 mm (5.3×3.3×2.0 in)	134.5×89×51 mm (5.3×3.5×2.0 in)	
Size	Wgt.	450 g (15.9 oz)	450 g (15.9 oz)	454 g (16 oz)	565 g (19.9 oz)	

Also in 1979, Yashica introduced a new line of manual and autoexposure cameras with shutter timing governed by a quartz clock with the Contax 139Q (also known as the 139 Quartz). This introduced a more compact form factor as well, and was followed by the Yashica FX-D (1980), with many of the same features, and the FX-70 (1983), a stripped-down version of the FX-D limited to aperture-priority autoexposure only. For its full-size quartz-timed cameras, Yashica released the Contax 137MD and 137MA in 1980 and 1981, respectively, which included a built-in motor film advance, followed by the RTS II (1982) to supplant its original professional model, incorporating quartz timing along with several detail improvements in a body nearly identical to the first RTS.

Contax/Yashica-mount SLRs (second generation, quartz-timed shutter)
Camera Feature		CONTAX	YASHICA		CONTAX		
Camera Feature		139Q	FX-D	FX-70	137MD	137MA	RTS II
Year		1979	1980	1983	1980	1981	1982
Shutter	Timing / Release	Q/EM					
Shutter	Speeds	B+1-1/1000 (stepless to 11 s in AE)		B+11-1/1000, stepless		B+1-1/1000 (stepless to 11 s in AE)	B+4-1/2000 (stepless to 16 s in AE)
Shutter	Material	metal			cloth		titanium
Shutter	Travel	Vert.			Horiz.		
Film transport		Manual, optional winder (2 fps)			built-in motor (3 fps)		Manual, optional winder (3 fps) or motor drive (5 fps)
Meter	Sensor	SPD					
Meter	Range (EV)	0 to +18	+1 to +18		0 to +18		-1 to +19
Meter	Modes	M,A,TTL	M,A	A	A,TTL	M,A,TTL	
Size	Dims. (W×H×D)	135×85.5×50 mm (5.3×3.4×2.0 in)	135×86×50.5 mm (5.3×3.4×2.0 in)	135×88.5×50 mm (5.3×3.5×2.0 in)	143×92.5×51 mm (5.6×3.6×2.0 in)		142×89.5×50 mm (5.6×3.5×2.0 in)
Size	Wgt.	500 g (17.6 oz)	460 g (16.2 oz)	435 g (15.3 oz)	665 g (23.5 oz) (Note: With batteries)	610 g (21.5 oz)	735 g (25.9 oz)

=== Third generation: new directions under Kyocera ===
After Kyocera acquired Yashica in 1983, several autofocus SLR projects under development were canceled, including the Yashica FX-A and Contax 139AF, which had been shown privately at photokina 1982. Starting in 1984, Yashica released its next generation of cameras, adding shutter-priority and program autoexposure modes, accompanied by a new generation of lenses designated MM. MM lenses were redesigned with a linear aperture setting to ensure the commanded aperture could be achieved using these exposure modes. These cameras included compact models (159MM, FX-103, Aria) as well as full-size models with built-in motors (167MT, 10x Multi Program, ST).

Contax/Yashica-mount SLRs (third generation, program and shutter-priority autoexposure)
Camera Feature		CONTAX	YASHICA	CONTAX	YASHICA	CONTAX	
Camera Feature		159MM	FX-103 Program	167MT	107/108/109 Multi-Program (Note: 107, 108, and 109 differ with respect to built-in motors for film transport)	ST	Aria
Year		1984	1985	1986	1989	1992	1998
Shutter	Timing / Release	Q/EM				E/EM	Q/EM
Shutter	Speeds	B+1-1/4000 (stepless to 60 s in AE)	B+1-1/1000 (stepless to 16 s in AE)	B+16-1/4000 (stepless in AE)	B+1-1/2000 (stepless to 16 s in AE)	B+1-1/6000 (stepless to 16 s in A,P)	B+4-1/4000 (stepless to 16 s in AE)
Shutter	Material	metal					
Shutter	Travel	Vert.					
Film transport		Manual, optional winder (3 fps)	Manual	built-in winder	Manual; some models include built-in motors	built-in motor (3 fps)	
Meter	Sensor	SPD					
Meter	Range (EV)	0 to +20	+3 to +18	0 to +20		0 to +20	
Meter	Modes	M,A,P,TTL	M,A,P,TTL	M,A,S,P,TTL	M,A,P,TTL	M,A,S,P,TTL	
Size	Dims. (W×H×D)	138×89×55 mm (5.4×3.5×2.2 in)	138×90×54 mm (5.4×3.5×2.1 in)	149×91.5×51.5 mm (5.9×3.6×2.0 in)	150×95×66 mm (5.9×3.75×2.6 in)	151.5×97.5×55 mm (6.0×3.8×2.2 in)	138×90×52 mm (5 7/16×3 9/16×2 1/16 in)
Size	Wgt.	520 g (18.3 oz)	460 g (16.2 oz)	620 g (21.9 oz)	510 g (18 oz)	800 g (28.2 oz)	460 g (16.2 oz)

Starting from 1990, flagship Contax cameras featured unique technological innovations, including a vacuum pump to hold the film flat (RTS III) and a gradual approach to implementing autofocus, starting with focus confirmation (RX) and followed by in-body autofocus (AX), which worked with manual focus lenses by moving the film plane inside the camera. A side benefit of this arrangement is that it allowed the AX to feature a macro mode which worked much like a built-in 10 mm extension tube, allowing for a magnification ratio higher than 1:1 without the use of bellows or extension tubes. By using a special adaptor made by Kyocera, Hasselblad V-series lenses could also be used on all Contax C/Y mount cameras. Thus users could perform auto-focus of Hasselblad V-series lenses with AX.

By this time, the Yashica-branded cameras were no longer being actively developed, as Kyocera focused its attention on the high end of the market. However, Yashica continued to target the professional market by permanently mounting the 100 mm Medical lens, derived from a bellows-mounted macro lens, on a body and selling it as the Dental Eye.

Contax/Yashica-mount SLRs (third generation, flagship cameras)
Camera Feature		CONTAX			
Camera Feature		RTS III	RX	AX	RX II
Year		1990	1994	1996	2002
Shutter	Timing / Release	Q/EM	E/EM		
Shutter	Speeds	B+4-1/8000 (stepless to 32 s in AE)	B+4-1/4000 (stepless to 16 s in A,P)	B+4-1/4000 (stepless to 32 s in A,P)	
Shutter	Material	metal			
Shutter	Travel	Vert.			
Film transport		built-in motor (5 fps)	built-in winder		
Meter	Sensor	SPD			
Meter	Range (EV)	0 to +21	+1 to +20	0 to +20	+1 to +20
Meter	Modes	M,A,S,TTL	M,A,S,P,TTL		
Size	Dims. (W×H×D)	156×121×66 mm (6.1×4.8×2.6 in)	151×104.5×59 mm (5.9×4.1×2.3 in)	162×123.5×72 mm (6.4×4.9×2.8 in)	151×104.5×59 mm (5.9×4.1×2.3 in)
Size	Wgt.	1,150 g (40.6 oz)	810 g (28.6 oz)	1,080 g (38.1 oz)	810 g (28.6 oz)

Kyocera pivoted back to autofocus cameras with the release of the Yashica 230 AF (1987) and Contax N1 (2001), but these broke support for the legacy C/Y lens mount to support autofocus operation. In April 2005, Kyocera announced it would discontinue production and distribution of Contax cameras by the end of the year, citing difficulties in transitioning to digital cameras.

=== Special models ===
- Contax RTS Fundus: usually marked 'Medical/Scientific' on the base plate it featured a 3mm high guard around the shutter release and a lock button on the front plate for the shutter speed dial. Several of these also had enhanced mirror dampers; most RTS Fundus cameras were sold for laboratory use, especially with Zeiss ophthalmic equipment.
- Contax Preview: a non-metered body with the mechanical shutter from the Yashica FX-3, a Polaroid Back and a Right-Angle Finder to correct the reversed image.
- Contax CGCM: a severely stripped down 137MD used by the Swedish military and for recording images from oscilloscopes and similar screens.
- Contax Preview II: an upgraded and faster mechanical shutter than the Preview; it used the shutter found in the S2/S2b.
- Yashica Dental-Eye (1985): a modified FX-3 with a permanently fixed 55 f/3.5 macro lens and ringflash; the shutter speed is also fixed at 1/60 s, and the lens aperture is set automatically according to film speed and reproduction ratio.
- Yashica Dental-Eye II: similar to the original Dental-Eye, now featuring the 100 mm f/4 Medical DX lens permanently fixed to a 107 Multi-Program body.
- Yashica Dental Eye III: a fully automatic, fixed lens single lens reflex dental camera made for intraoral photography and based on the Contax RX. Features a 100mm f/4 lens with integrated flash.
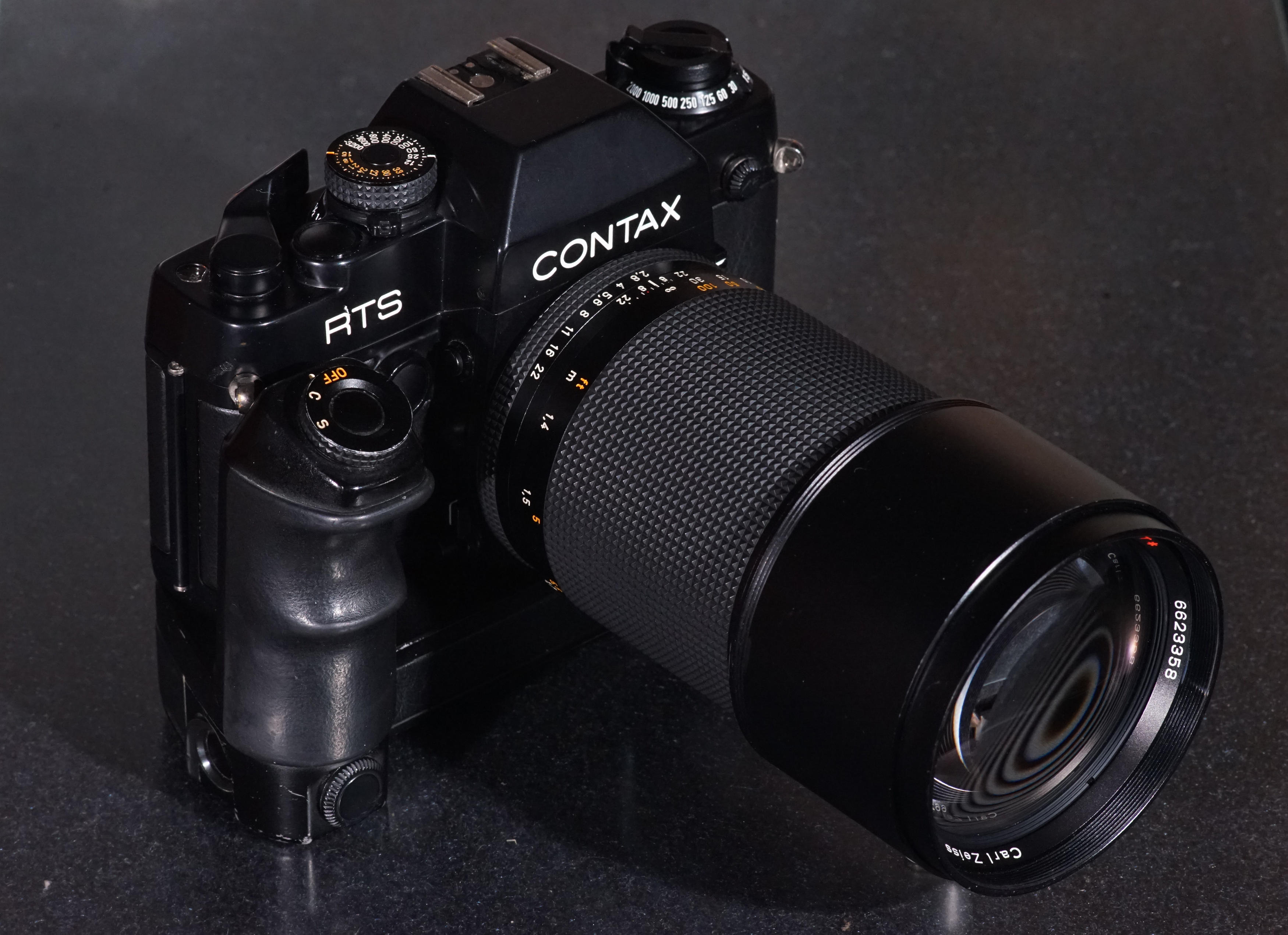
Contax RTS II Quartz with Sonnar T* f2,8 180 mm

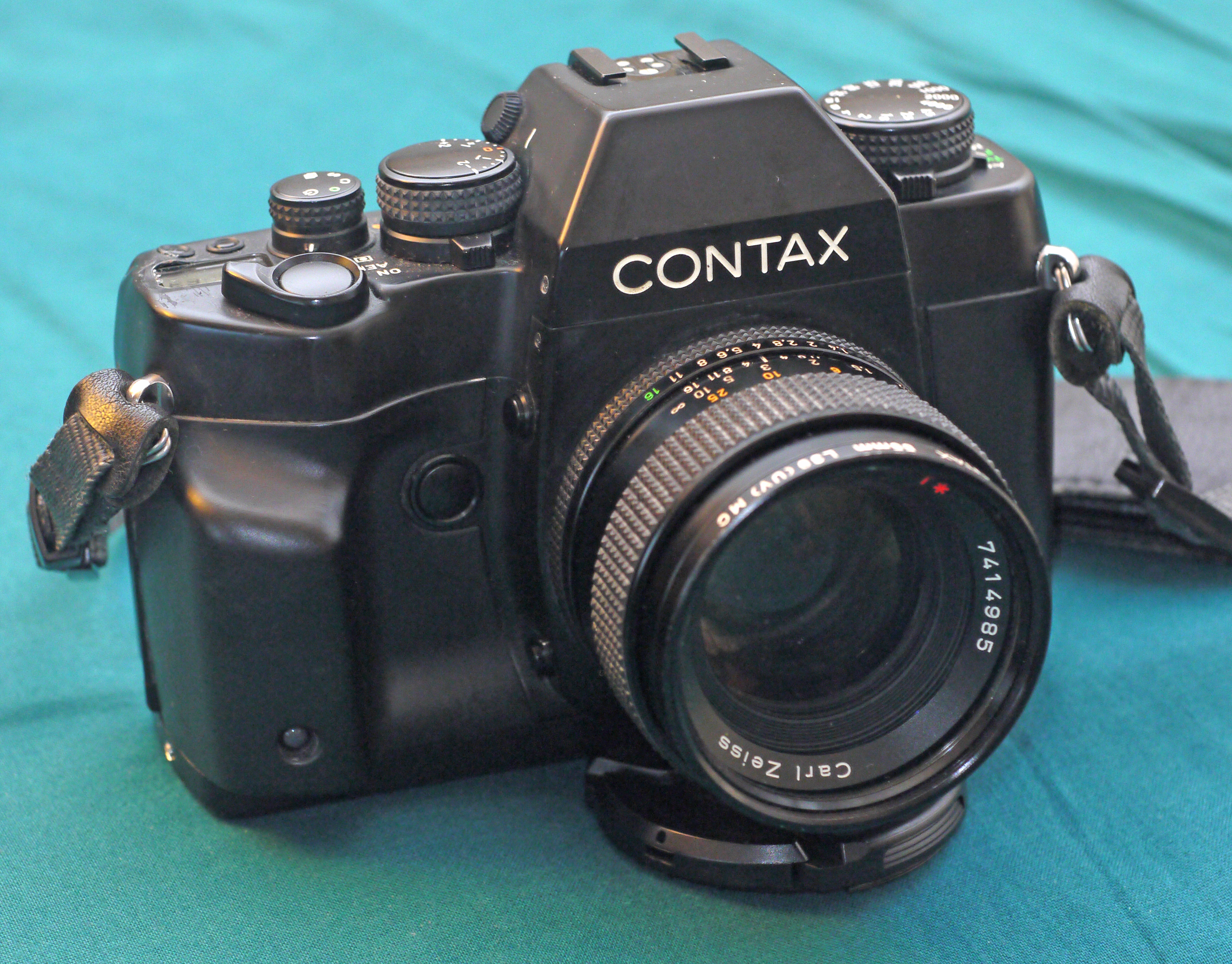
Contax RTS III with Planar T* f1,4 50 mm

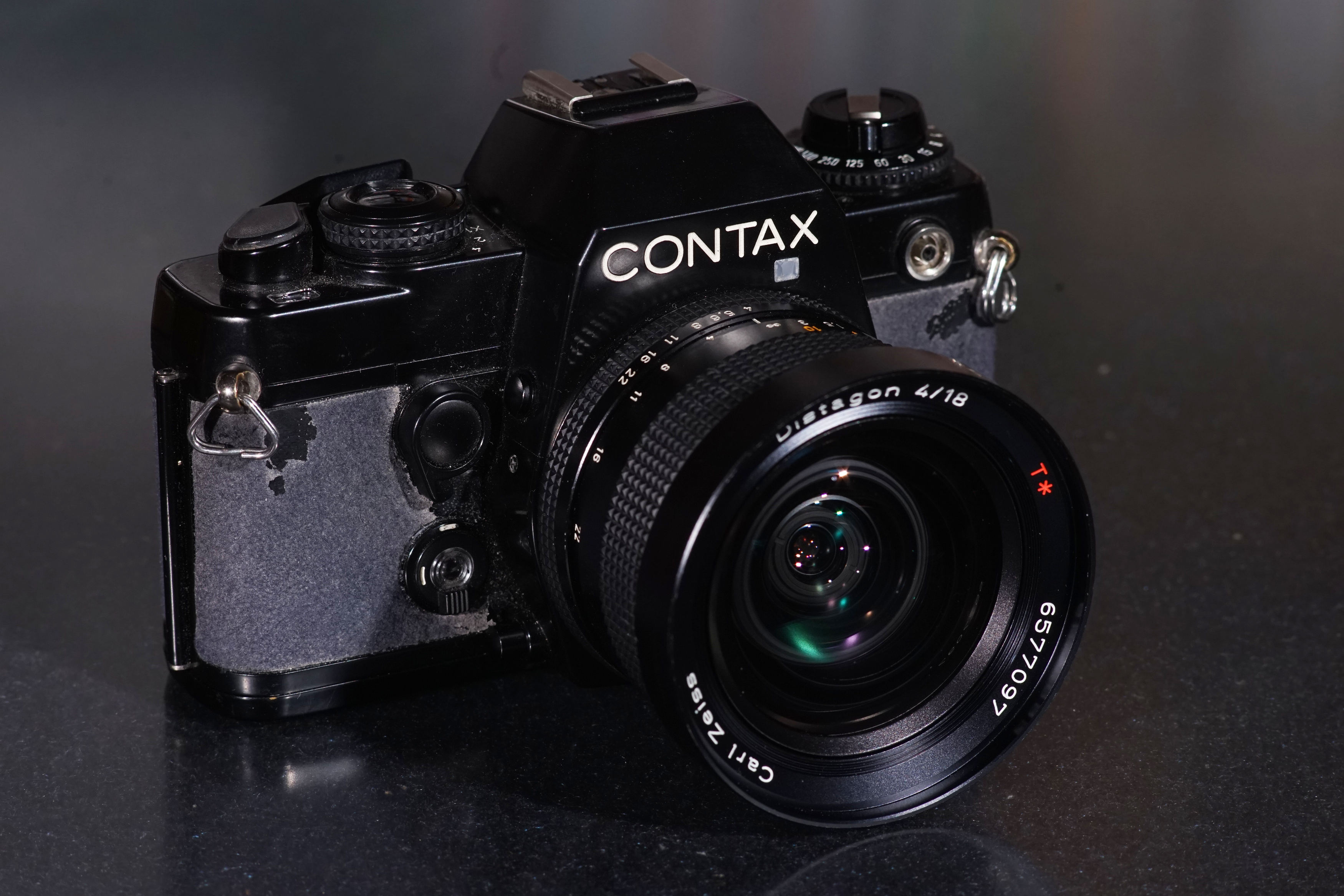
Contax 139 Quartz with Distagon T* f4,0 18 mm

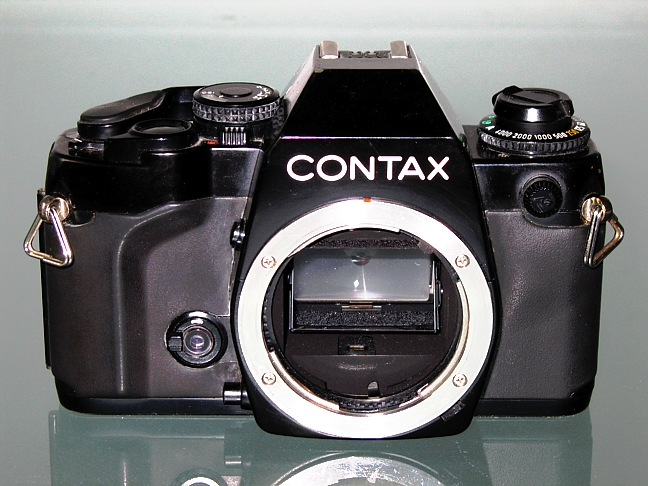
Contax 159MM body

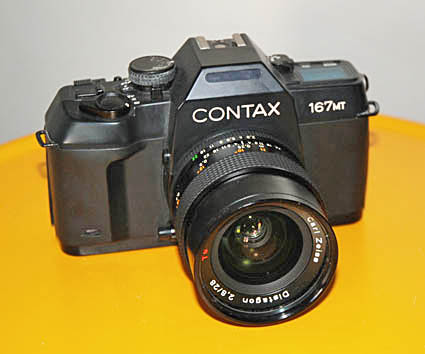
Contax 167MT with Distagon T* f2,8 28 mm

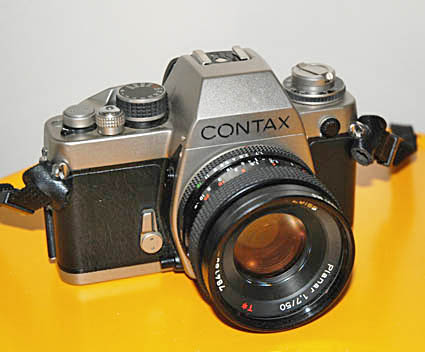
Contax S2 with Planar T* f1,7 50 mm

== Lenses ==
Like its first attempt at forging an alliance with Pentax, Zeiss designed a new lens mount, known as Contax/Yashica mount (C/Y), which was used on cameras bearing both marques. A new prestige line of lenses designed by Carl Zeiss was introduced for the RTS, with the common C/Y bayonet mount allowing lens interchange between all 35 mm Contax and Yashica SLR camera models.

Mechanical features and couplings on a Contax/Yashica body

The Contax/Yashica lens mount uses a three-clawed stainless steel bayonet interface with a flange focal distance of 45.5 mm. Looking at the mount on the body from the front of the camera, there is a red dot on the body at the 12 o'clock position which matches a corresponding index mark on the lens; the lens is inserted with the two marks aligned and turned clockwise by 72° to lock the lens and body together. One of the three claws on the lens has a locking notch at approximately 11:30 (viewing the lens from rear to front) which mates with a corresponding tab on the body at approximately 12:30 on the body. The lens escutcheon on the body has a lens release button at approximately 10 o'clock, which is depressed to release the lock.

Corresponding mechanical features and couplings on a Contax/Yashica lens

There are three mechanical connections which operate the automatic diaphragm and communicate lens information: the automatic diaphragm action lever, at the 6 o'clock position on the body within the bayonet, which stops down the lens to the set aperture during the exposure; the aperture keying lever, at the 2 o'clock position on the body within the bayonet, which reads the aperture setting from the lens; and the aperture scale coupling pin, at the 12 o'clock position on the lens, which shifts the viewfinder aperture scale so the maximum aperture of the lens is displayed on the right. In 1985, a new line of MM lenses was released alongside the 159MM, which has a fourth lens information connection called the MM indicator; this tells the body if an MM lens is mounted, at approximately 5 o'clock on the body outside the bayonet. The 159MM introduced shutter-priority and program autoexposure modes; MM lenses have green-colored numbers for the minimum aperture setting, distinguishing them cosmetically from earlier (AE series) lenses.

C/Y bayonet lens mount

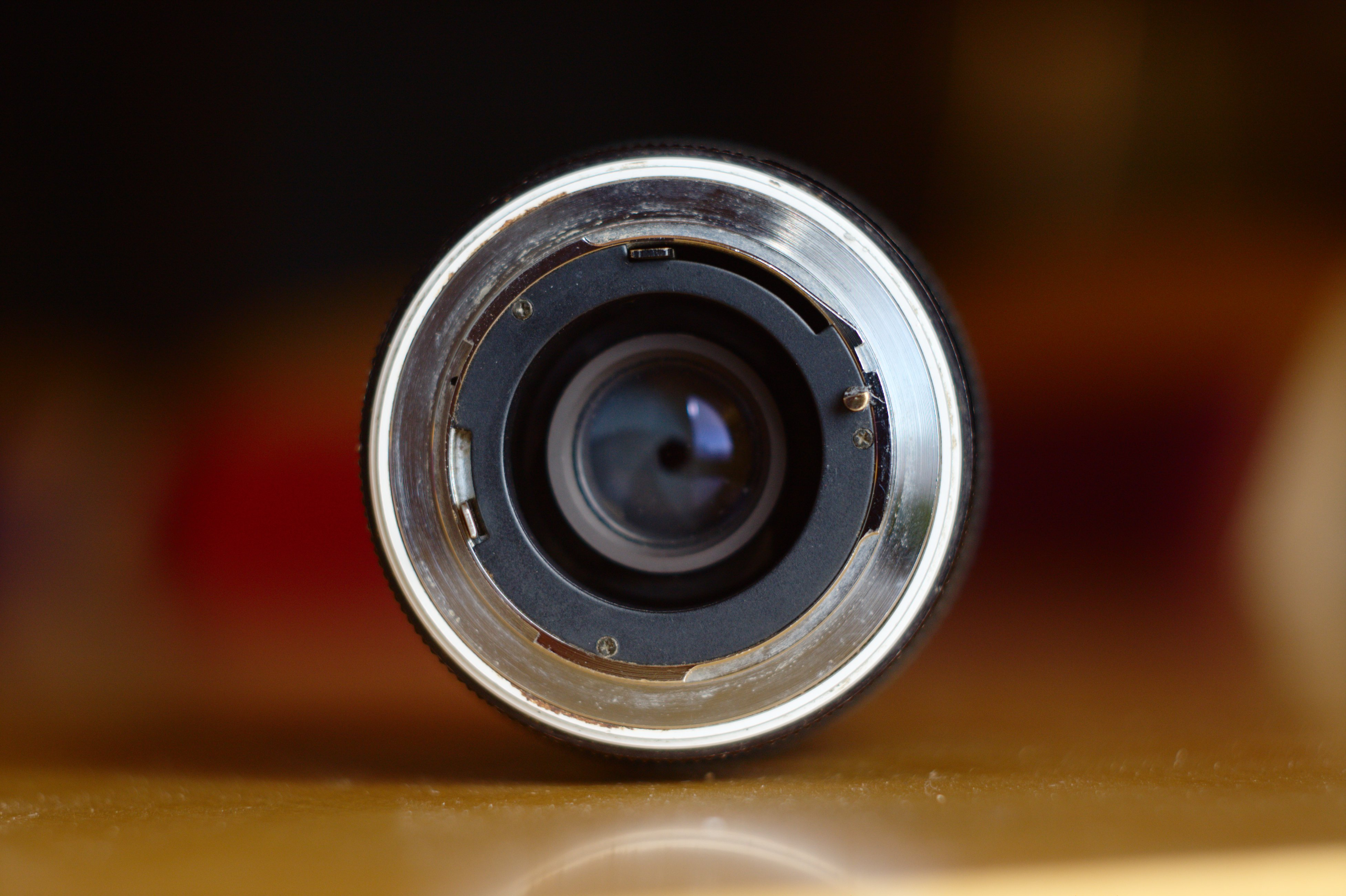
Lens side; note aperture stop-down lever (6 o'clock) is on the left and the aperture scale coupling pin (12 o'clock) is on the right.

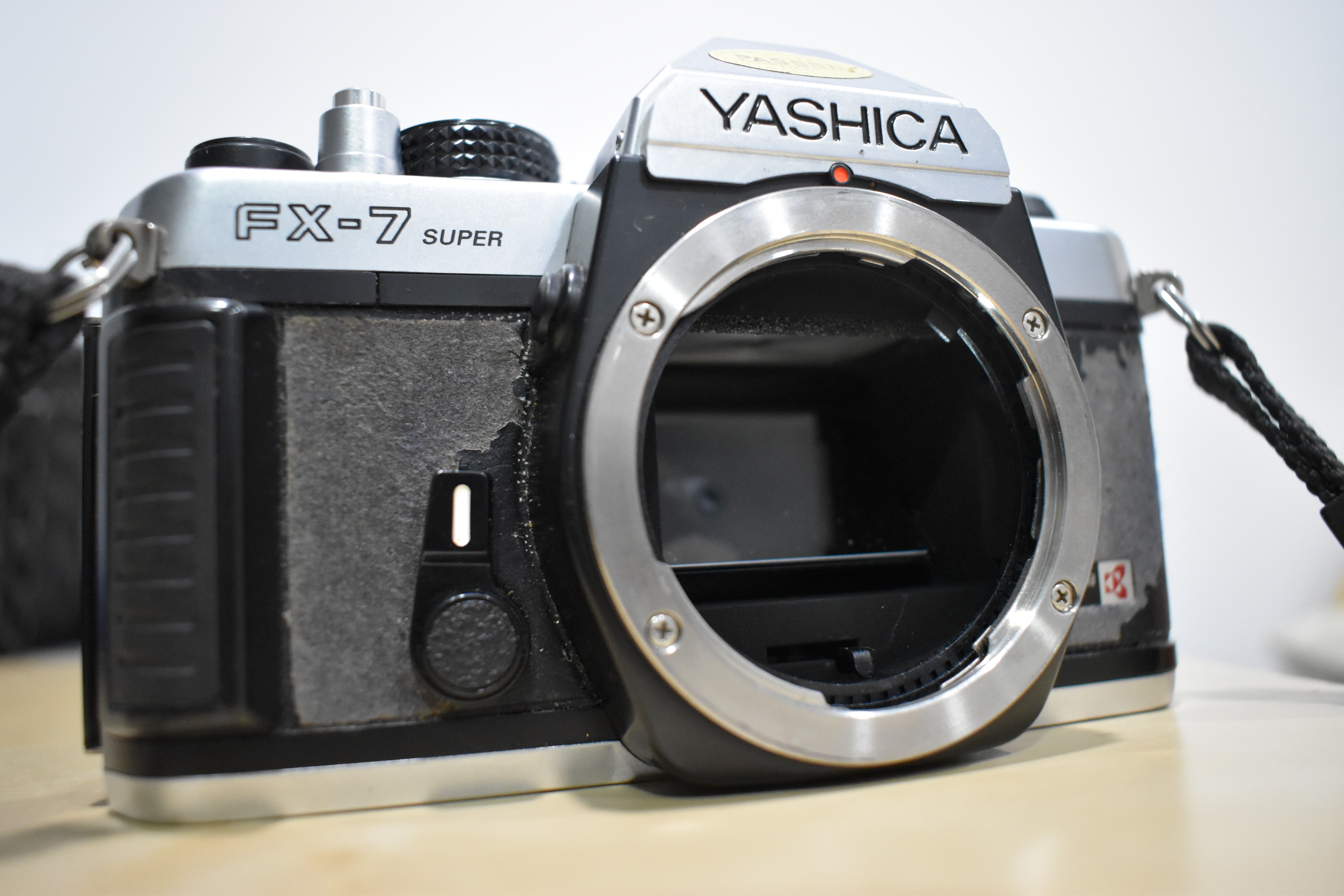
Body side, Yashica FX-7 Super

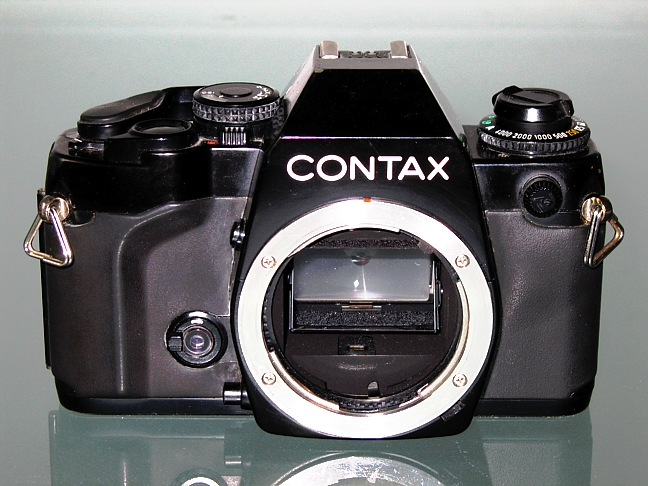
Body side, Contax 159MM; note MM notch at 5 o'clock

Contax/Yashica mount lenses
Name (Note: Indicates brand and presence of multicoating (ML, T*) or single coating (DSB))	FL	Ap.	Const.	Min. focus	Filt.	Angle	Φ×L	Wgt.	Notes
Fisheye and ultra wide angle lenses
Yashica ML	15	f/2.8–16	10e/7g	0.3 m (1 ft 0 in)	built-in	170°	75×70.5 mm (2.95×2.78 in)	445 g (15.7 oz)	
Zeiss F-Distagon T*	16	f/2.8–22	8e/7g	0.3 m (1 ft 0 in)	built-in	180°	70×61.5 mm (2.76×2.42 in)	460 g (16 oz)	
Zeiss Distagon T*	15	f/3.5–22	13e/12g	0.16 m (6.3 in)	built-in	110°	83.5×94 mm (3.29×3.70 in)	875 g (30.9 oz)	
Zeiss Distagon T*	18	f/2.8–22	12e/11g	0.2 m (7.9 in)	86	100°	70×88.5 mm (2.76×3.48 in)	?	
Zeiss Distagon T*	18	f/4.0–22	10e/9g	0.3 m (1 ft 0 in)	70	100°	60×51.5 mm (2.36×2.03 in)	350 g (12 oz)	
Zeiss Distagon T*	21	f/2.8–22	15e/13g	0.25 m (9.8 in)	82	92°	85×90.5 mm (3.35×3.56 in)	530 g (19 oz)	
Yashica ML	21	f/3.5–16	12e/8g	0.3 m (1 ft 0 in)	72	90°	75×54 mm (3.0×2.1 in)	370 g (13 oz)	
Wide angle lenses
Yashica ML	24	f/2.8–16	9e/8g	0.3 m (1 ft 0 in)	62	84°	65×48.5 mm (2.56×1.91 in)	285 g (10.1 oz)	
Zeiss Distagon T*	25	f/2.8–22	8e/7g	0.25 m (9.8 in)	55	82°	62.5×56 mm (2.46×2.20 in)	380 g (13 oz)	
Zeiss Distagon T*	28	f/2.0–22	9e/8g	0.24 m (9.4 in)	55	74°	62.5×76 mm (2.46×2.99 in)	530 g (19 oz)	
Yashica DSB	28	f/2.8–16	6e/6g	0.3 m (1 ft 0 in)	52	75°	61×42.5 mm (2.40×1.67 in)	240 g (8.5 oz)	
Yashica ML	28	f/2.8–16	7e/6g	0.3 m (1 ft 0 in)	52	75°	61.5×41.5 mm (2.42×1.63 in)	250 g (8.8 oz)	
Yashica YUS	28	f/2.8–22	?	0.35 m (1 ft 2 in)	55	75°	63.5×44 mm (2.50×1.73 in)	260 g (9.2 oz)	
Zeiss Distagon T*	28	f/2.8–22	7e/7g	0.25 m (9.8 in)	55	74°	62.5×50 mm (2.46×1.97 in)	280 g (9.9 oz)	
Yashica ML Zoom	28~50	f/3.5–22	10e/8g	1 m (3 ft 3 in)	72	74~48°	75×74.5 mm (2.95×2.93 in)	475 g (16.8 oz)	
Zeiss Vario-Sonnar T*	28~70	f/3.5~4.5–22	9e/8g	0.5 m (1 ft 8 in)	67	77°12'~35°12'	70.0×68.3 mm (2.76×2.69 in)	325 g (11.5 oz)	
Yashica MC Zoom	28~80	f/3.9~4.9–22	13e/9g	0.5 m (1 ft 8 in)	58	74~31°	75×87.5 mm (2.95×3.44 in)	550 g (19 oz)	
Zeiss Vario-Sonnar T*	28~85	f/3.3~4.0–22	16e/13g	0.6 m (2 ft 0 in)	82	75~29°	85.0×99.5 mm (3.35×3.92 in)	735 g (25.9 oz)	
Yashica ML Zoom	28~85	f/3.5~4.5–22	15e/13g	1.7 m (5 ft 7 in)	67	74~29°	70×89.5 mm (2.76×3.52 in)	535 g (18.9 oz)	
Zeiss Distagon T*	35	f/1.4–16	9e/8g	0.3 m (1 ft 0 in)	67	62°30'	70×76 mm (2.8×3.0 in)	600 g (21 oz)	
Zeiss Distagon T*	35	f/2.8–22	6e/6g	0.4 m (1 ft 4 in)	55	62°	62.5×46 mm (2.46×1.81 in)	245 g (8.6 oz)	
Zeiss PC-Distagon T*	35	f/2.8–22	9e/9g	0.3 m (1 ft 0 in)	70	63°	70×85.5 mm (2.76×3.37 in)	725 g (25.6 oz)	Perspective control
Yashica ML	35	f/2.8–16	6e/5g	0.3 m (1 ft 0 in)	52	63°	61.5×41.5 mm (2.42×1.63 in)	230 g (8.1 oz)	
Zeiss Vario-Sonnar T*	35~70	f/3.4–22	10e/10g	0.7 m (2 ft 4 in)	67	64~34°	70.0×80.5 mm (2.76×3.17 in)	475 g (16.8 oz)	
Yashica ML Zoom	35~70	f/3.5–22	7e/7g	0.6 m (2 ft 0 in)	55	64~35°	67×71 mm (2.6×2.8 in)	390 g (14 oz)	
Yashica MC Zoom	35~70	f/3.5~4.5–22	7e/7g	0.8 m (2 ft 7 in)	52	64~35°	64×65 mm (2.5×2.6 in)	337 g (11.9 oz)	
Yashica ML Zoom	35~105	f/3.5~4.5–22	15e/11g	1.5 m (4 ft 11 in)	55	64~23°40'	65×84.5 mm (2.56×3.33 in)	470 g (17 oz)	
Yashica DSB Zoom	35~105	f/3.8~4.8–22	15e/14g	1.4 m (4 ft 7 in)	55	64~23°40'	64.5×82.5 mm (2.54×3.25 in)	460 g (16 oz)	
Zeiss Vario-Sonnar T*	35~135	f/3.3~4.5–22	16e/15g	1.3 m (4 ft 3 in)	82	64~18°	85.0×107 mm (3.35×4.21 in)	860 g (30 oz)	
Yashica DSB Zoom	38~90	f/3.5–22	12e/11g	1.5 m (4 ft 11 in)	67	58~25°30'	70×110.5 mm (2.76×4.35 in)	685 g (24.2 oz)	
Normal lenses
Zeiss Vario-Sonnar T*	40~80	f/3.5–22	13e/9g	1.2 m (3 ft 11 in)	55	55–31°	67×87 mm (2.6×3.4 in)	605 g (21.3 oz)	
Yashica ML Zoom	42~75	f/3.5~4.5–22	7e/7g	1.2 m (3 ft 11 in)	55	53~33°	61×57 mm (2.4×2.2 in)	315 g (11.1 oz)	
Zeiss Tessar T*	45	f/2.8–22	4e/3g	0.6 m (2 ft 0 in)	49	50°	60×18 mm (2.36×0.71 in)	90 g (3.2 oz)	
Zeiss Planar T*	50	f/1.4–16	7e/6g	0.45 m (1 ft 6 in)	55	45°	62.5×41 mm (2.46×1.61 in)	275 g (9.7 oz)	
Yashica ML	50	f/1.4–16	7e/6g	0.5 m (1 ft 8 in)	52	46°	61.5×42 mm (2.42×1.65 in)	295 g (10.4 oz)	
Zeiss Planar T*	50	f/1.7–16	7e/6g	0.6 m (2 ft 0 in)	55	45°	61×36.5 mm (2.40×1.44 in)	190 g (6.7 oz)	
Yashica ML	50	f/1.7–16	6e/5g	0.5 m (1 ft 8 in)	52	46°	61.5×40 mm (2.42×1.57 in)	240 g (8.5 oz)	
Yashica ML	50	f/1.9–16	6e/5g	0.5 m (1 ft 8 in)	52	46°	61×32 mm (2.4×1.3 in)	140 g (4.9 oz)	
Yashica DSB	50	f/1.9–16	6e/5g	0.5 m (1 ft 8 in)	52	46°	62×40 mm (2.4×1.6 in)	210 g (7.4 oz)	
Yashica ML	50	f/2.0–16	6e/4g	0.5 m (1 ft 8 in)	52	46°	61×32 mm (2.4×1.3 in)	140 g (4.9 oz)	
Zeiss Planar T*	55	f/1.2–16	8e/7g	0.6 m (2 ft 0 in)	77	43°	80×60 mm (3.1×2.4 in)	500 g (18 oz)	Limited edition
Yashica ML	55	f/1.2–16	7e/6g	0.5 m (1 ft 8 in)	55	43°	66.5×50 mm (2.62×1.97 in)	410 g (14 oz)	
Yashica DSB	55	f/2.0–16	6e/4g	0.5 m (1 ft 8 in)	52	43°	63×39.5 mm (2.48×1.56 in)	200 g (7.1 oz)	
Yashica ML Macro	55	f/2.8–22	6e/4g	0.25 m (9.8 in)	52	43°	61.5×56.5 mm (2.42×2.22 in)	305 g (10.8 oz)	
Yashica ML Macro	55	f/4.0–22	4e/3g	0.25 m (9.8 in)	52	43°	61.5×55 mm (2.42×2.17 in)	305 g (10.8 oz)	
Zeiss S-Planar T*	60	f/2.8–22	6e/5g	0.24 m (9.4 in)	67	39°	75.5×74 mm (2.97×2.91 in)	570 g (20 oz)	
Zeiss Makro-Planar T*	60	f/2.8–22	6e/4g	0.24 m (9.4 in)	67	39°	75.5×74 mm (2.97×2.91 in)	570 g (20 oz)	Focuses to 1:1
Zeiss Makro-Planar C T*	60	f/2.8–22	6e/4g	0.27 m (11 in)	55	39°	65.5×51 mm (2.58×2.01 in)	260 g (9.2 oz)	(C)ompact version, focuses to 1:2
Portrait lenses
Zeiss Vario-Sonnar T*	70~210	f/3.5–22	15e/12g	1.8 m (5 ft 11 in)	67	33–12°	77×186 mm (3.0×7.3 in)	1,145 g (40.4 oz)	
Yashica DSB Zoom	70~210	f/4.0–22	14e/10g	2.5 m (8 ft 2 in)	58	34°30'~12°	65×165 mm (2.6×6.5 in)	690 g (24 oz)	
Yashica ML Zoom	70~210	f/4.5–22	12e/9g	1.5 m (4 ft 11 in)	55	33°30'~12°	65×128.5 mm (2.56×5.06 in)	525 g (18.5 oz)	
Yashica ML Zoom	75~150	f/4.0–22	12e/9g	1.5 m (4 ft 11 in)	52	32~16°30'	63.5×115.5 mm (2.50×4.55 in)	485 g (17.1 oz)	
Yashica MC Zoom	75~200	f/4.5–22	12e/9g	1.0 m (3 ft 3 in)	55	32~12°	64×120 mm (2.5×4.7 in)	485 g (17.1 oz)	
Zeiss Vario-Sonnar T*	80~200	f/4.0–22	13e/10g	1.0 m (3 ft 3 in)	55	30°30'~12°10'	67.0×160.5 mm (2.64×6.32 in)	475 g (16.8 oz)	
Yashica ML Zoom	80~200	f/4.0–22	12e/9g	1.9 m (6 ft 3 in)	55	30~12°20'	65×133 mm (2.6×5.2 in)	610 g (22 oz)	
Zeiss Planar T*	85	f/1.2–16	8e/7g	1.0 m (3 ft 3 in)	77	29°	80×72.5 mm (3.15×2.85 in)	874 g (30.8 oz)	
Zeiss Planar T*	85	f/1.4–16	6e/5g	1.0 m (3 ft 3 in)	67	28°30'	70×64 mm (2.8×2.5 in)	595 g (21.0 oz)	
Zeiss Sonnar T*	85	f/2.8–22	5e/4g	1.0 m (3 ft 3 in)	55	27°30'	62.5×47 mm (2.46×1.85 in)	255 g (9.0 oz)	
Zeiss Planar T*	100	f/2.0–22	6e/5g	1.0 m (3 ft 3 in)	67	24°30'	70×84 mm (2.8×3.3 in)	670 g (24 oz)	
Zeiss Makro-Planar T*	100	f/2.8–22	7e/7g	0.41 m (1 ft 4 in)	67	24°	76.0×86.5 mm (2.99×3.41 in)	740 g (26 oz)	Focuses to 1:1
Zeiss Sonnar T*	100	f/3.5–22	5e/4g	1.0 m (3 ft 3 in)	55	24°	61×61 mm (2.4×2.4 in)	285 g (10.1 oz)	
Yashica ML Macro	100	f/3.5–22	6e/4g	0.44 m (1 ft 5 in)	55	24°	67×77 mm (2.6×3.0 in)	430 g (15 oz)	
Zeiss S-Planar T* Bellows	100	f/4.0–32	6e/4g	—N/a	55	24°30'	62.5×48.5 mm (2.46×1.91 in)	285 g (10.1 oz)	Bellows only
Yashica ML Bellows	100	f/4.0–32	5e/3g	—N/a	52	24°	60×32 mm (2.4×1.3 in)	190 g (6.7 oz)	For use on bellows
Yashica Medical	100	f/4.0–22	5e/3g	0.14 m (5.5 in)	35.5	24°	94.5×155.5 mm (3.72×6.12 in)	1,000 g (35 oz)	Aperture coupled to magnification; set to a fixed reproduction ratio ranging from 1/15 to 1/1; 2× close-up lens optional
Zeiss Vario-Sonnar T*	100~300	f/4.5~5.6–32	12e/7g	1.5 m (4 ft 11 in)	67	24~8°	71.0×143 mm (2.80×5.63 in)	925 g (32.6 oz)	
Yashica ML Zoom	100~300	f/5.6–32	13e/10g	1.5 m (4 ft 11 in)	58	24~8°30'	68.5×192.5 mm (2.70×7.58 in)	850 g (30 oz)	
Zeiss Planar T*	135	f/2.0–22	5e/5g	1.5 m (4 ft 11 in)	72	18°30'	75×101 mm (3.0×4.0 in)	830 g (29 oz)	
Zeiss Sonnar T*	135	f/2.8–22	5e/4g	1.6 m (5 ft 3 in)	55	18°30'	68.5×93 mm (2.70×3.66 in)	585 g (20.6 oz)	
Yashica DSB	135	f/2.8–22	5e/4g	1.8 m (5 ft 11 in)	55	18°	64×72 mm (2.5×2.8 in)	420 g (15 oz)	
Yashica ML	135	f/2.8–22	5e/4g	1.5 m (4 ft 11 in)	55	18°	65.5×92.5 mm (2.58×3.64 in)	540 g (19 oz)	
Yashica ML (C)	135	f/2.8–22	5e/4g	1.5 m (4 ft 11 in)	52	18°30'	63×75 mm (2.5×3.0 in)	420 g (15 oz)	
Telephoto lenses
Zeiss Sonnar T*	180	f/2.8–22	6e/5g	1.4 m (4 ft 7 in)	72	14°	78–82×131 mm (3.1–3.2×5.2 in)	815–985 g (28.7–34.7 oz)	Cosmetic variations
Zeiss Aposonnar T*	200	f/2.0–22	10e/8g	1.8 m (5 ft 11 in)	drop-in	12°40'	120×182 mm (4.7×7.2 in)	2,690 g (95 oz)	
Zeiss Tele-Tessar T*	200	f/3.5–22	6e/5g	1.8 m (5 ft 11 in)	67	12°40'	77.5×121.5 mm (3.05×4.78 in)	750 g (26 oz)	
Zeiss Tele-Tessar T*	200	f/4.0–22	6e/5g	1.5 m (4 ft 11 in)	55	12°40'	66.5×122 mm (2.62×4.80 in)	550 g (19 oz)	
Yashica ML	200	f/4.0–22	5e/4g	2.5 m (8 ft 2 in)	55	12°	62×150 mm (2.4×5.9 in)	615 g (21.7 oz)	
Yashica ML (C)	200	f/4.0–22	5e/4g	2.5 m (8 ft 2 in)	52	12°30'	64×113.5 mm (2.52×4.47 in)	535 g (18.9 oz)	
Zeiss N-Mirotar	210	f/1.5 (f/0.03 equiv.)	4e/4g (mirror) + 12e/10g (relay)	20 m (66 ft)	—N/a	8°	90×365 mm (3.5×14.4 in)	2,170 g (77 oz)	Light amplifier
Zeiss Tele-Apotessar T*	300	f/2.8–22	8e/7g	3.5 m (11 ft)	drop-in	8°10'	120.0×244 mm (4.72×9.61 in)	2,730 g (96 oz)	
Zeiss Tele-Tessar T*	300	f/4.0–32	5e/5g	3.5 m (11 ft)	82	8°15'	88.0×205 mm (3.46×8.07 in)	1,200 g (42 oz)	
Yashica ML	300	f/5.6–22	5e/4g	4.5 m (15 ft)	58	8°	65×210 mm (2.6×8.3 in)	880 g (31 oz)	
Yashica ML	300	f/5.6–22	6e/3g	4.5 m (15 ft)	58	8°30'	66×147.5 mm (2.60×5.81 in)	645 g (22.8 oz)	
Yashica ML	400	f/5.6–32	5e/5g	8 m (26 ft)	77	8°30'	?	?	
Zeiss Mirotar	500	f/4.5	5e/5g	3.5 m (11 ft)	slide+built-in	5°	151×225 mm (5.9×8.9 in)	4,500 g (160 oz)	
Zeiss Tele-Apotessar T*	500	f/5.6–45	9e/7g	3.5 m (11 ft)	drop-in	5°	112×290 mm (4.4×11.4 in)	1,865 g (65.8 oz)	
Zeiss Mirotar	500	f/8	6e/4g	3.5 m (11 ft)	82	5°	88×113.5 mm (3.46×4.47 in)	802 g (28.3 oz)	
Yashica Reflex	500	f/8	6e/5g	4 m (13 ft)	slide-in	5°	88×120.5 mm (3.46×4.74 in)	865 g (30.5 oz)	
Yashica ML Reflex	500	f/8	8e/6g	2.5 m (8 ft 2 in)	slide-in	5°	78×87.5 mm (3.07×3.44 in)	470 g (17 oz)	
Zeiss Tele-Apotessar T*	800	f/8–64	8e/6g	4.0 m (13.1 ft)	drop-in	3°	128.5×505 mm (5.06×19.88 in)	3,250 g (115 oz)	
Zeiss Mirotar	1000	f/5.6	5e/5g	12 m (39 ft)	slide+built-in	2°30'	250×470 mm (9.8×18.5 in)	16,500 g (580 oz)	
Yashica Reflex	1000	f/11	6e/5g	8.0 m (26.2 ft)	built-in	2°30'	118×220 mm (4.6×8.7 in)	2,330 g (82 oz)	
Teleconverters
Zeiss Mutar T* I	2×	+2	6e/5g	—N/a	—N/a	approx ÷2	64.5×37.5 mm (2.54×1.48 in)	240 g (8.5 oz)	Generally recommended with focal lengths between 45 and 200 mm
Zeiss Mutar T* II	2×	+2	7e/4g	—N/a	—N/a	approx ÷2	64.5×51.0 mm (2.54×2.01 in)	300 g (11 oz)	Generally recommended with focal lengths ≥135 mm
Zeiss Mutar T* III	1.4×	+1	6e/4g	—N/a	—N/a	approx ÷1.4	64.5×22.5 mm (2.54×0.89 in)	230 g (8.1 oz)	Generally recommended with focal lengths ≥100 mm
