= Kenko (company) =

Japanese manufacturer

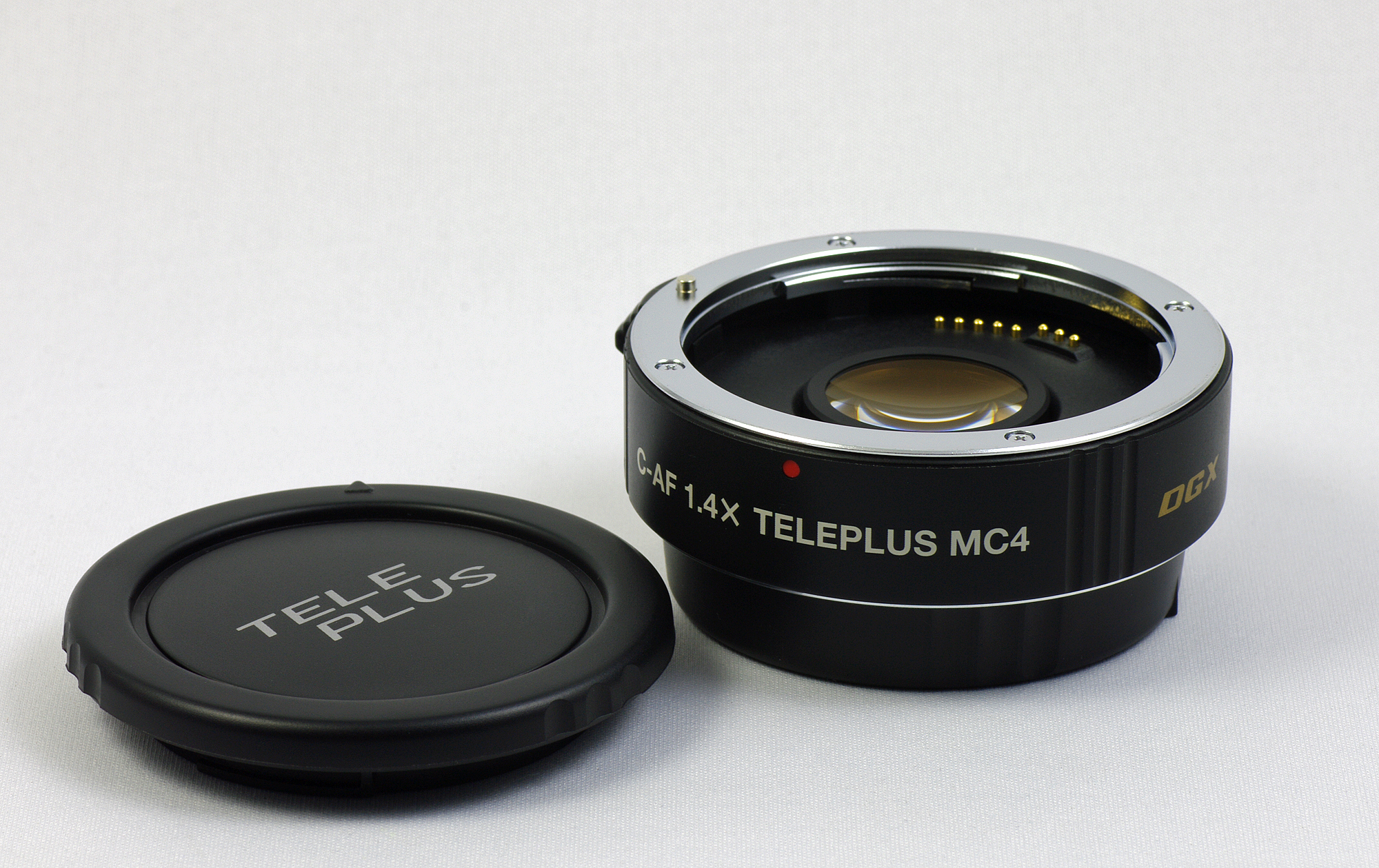
Teleconverter Kenko 1.4× Teleplus MC4 DGX

Kenko Co., Ltd. (株式会社ケンコー, Kabushiki-gaisha Kenkō) is a Japanese manufacturer and trading company of photographic accessories, especially known for its teleconverters and filters. Located in Tokyo, it has been producing conversion lenses since the 1960s. It produces camera lenses under the Kenko and Tokina brand names. It also manufactures a beginner's 35 mm SLR camera (using the Nikon F-mount) under the Kenko name. On June 22, 2011, Tokina announces its merger with Kenko.

== Lenses ==
For current Kenko teleconverters and lens extension rings see List of Nikon compatible lenses with integrated autofocus-motor (note that Canon EF versions also exist).

== See also ==
- Canon Extender EF
- Nikon F-mount teleconverter
- Tokina
- List of Kenko teleconverters with Nikon F-mount
