= Contax RTS =

SLR camera

The Contax RTS (1975) was a premium quality SLR camera produced by Yashica under licence from Zeiss (company) who produced all the very high quality optics. The first RTS (short for "Real Time System") was designed by Prof. Dr. Katsuiko Sugaya, styled by the Porsche Design studio, and manufactured by Yashica as Top Secret Project 130. The cameras were designed to compete with, and priced comparably to, the Leica R series in the high-end professional market.

The RTS was followed by the RTS II in 1982, which added TTL flash metering and a titanium shutter. In 1983 Yashica was acquired by Kyocera, and in 1990 the RTS III added a Kyocera-designed ceramic vacuum film pressure plate.

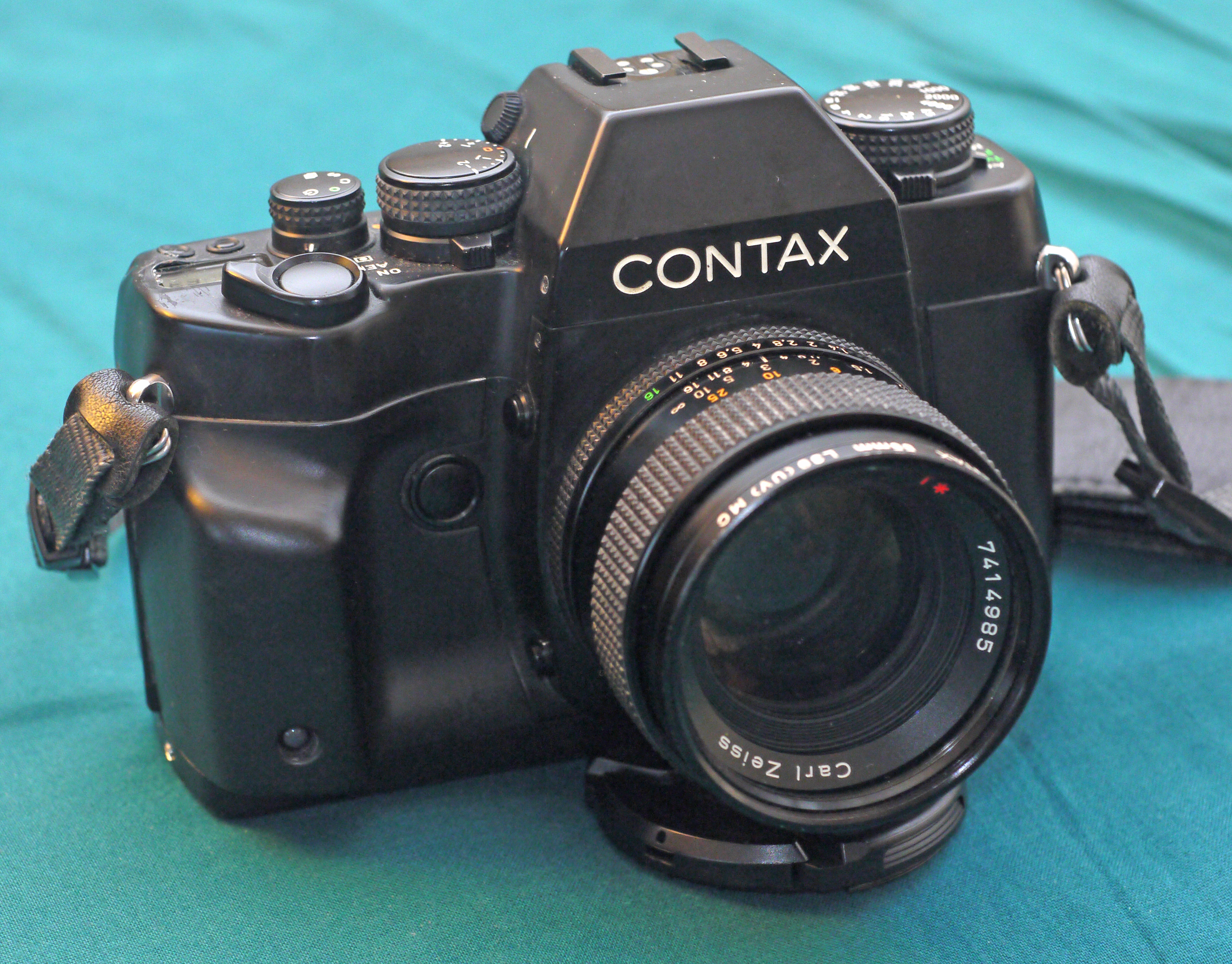
Contax RTS III with 1.4, 50mm lens
