= Heinrich Kühn =

Austrian photographer (1866–1944)

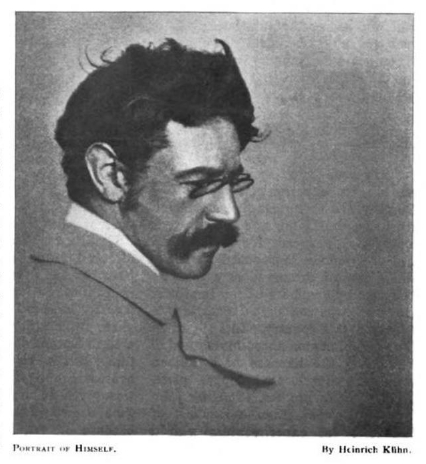
Self portrait.

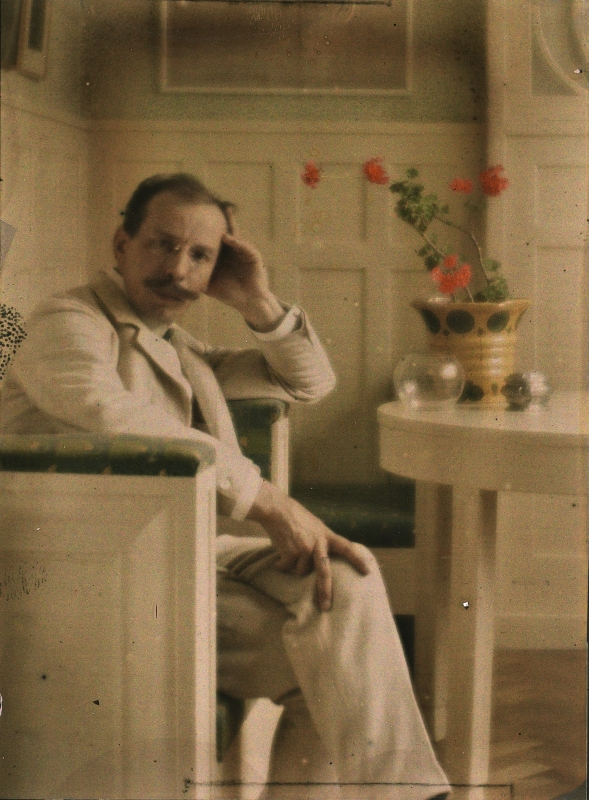
Self portrait.

Carl Christian Heinrich Kühn (25 February 1866 in Dresden – 14 September 1944 in Birgitz) was an Austrian–German photographer and photography pioneer.

== Overview ==
Heinrich Kühn is regarded one of the forefathers of fine art photography, the movement that helped photography to establish itself as an art on its own. His photographs closely resemble impressionist paintings, with their frequent use of soft lighting and focus. Kühn was part of the pictorialist photographic movement.

Kühn mainly used the gum bichromate technique, applied in several layers, and thus allowing for previously unseen color tonalities.

In 1911, Kühn invented the Gummigravüre technique, a combination of photogravure and Gum bichromate. In 1915, he developed the Leimdruck technique, which uses Animal glue as Colloid and produces pictures similar to gum prints. He also invented the Syngraphie, a forgotten technique that uses two negatives of different sensitivity to obtain a larger tonal spectrum.

Kühn used Autochrome from its appearance in 1907; his Autochromes have been called "ethereal dreams of childhood, full of vaulted sunny skies and giddy perspectives, as gloriously cathartic as they are emotionally charged". His photographs are also part of the Fotografis collection, which was presented at the beginning of 2009 in Prague.

== See also ==
- Anachromat Kühn (aka Rodenstock Tiefenbildner-Imagon)

== Literature ==
- Ulrich Knapp (Text): Heinrich Kühn Photographien. Residenz Verlag, Salzburg 1988, ISBN 3-7017-0528-3.
- The History of European Photography 1900-1938, FOTOFO, 2011. ISBN 978-80-85739-55-8.
