= Lens board =

Accessory for view cameras

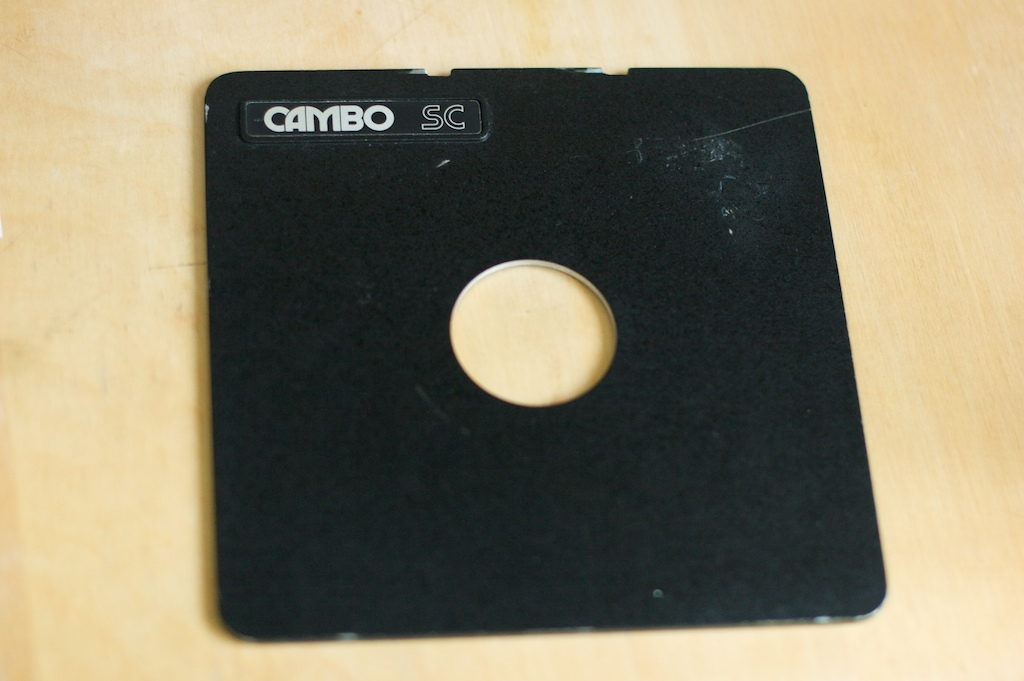
Cambo lens board with Copal #1

A lens board is a stiff, opaque board with a hole in the center, onto which a lens is mounted, so that the lens can be attached easily to the front of a view camera or to the bottom of a photographic enlarger. The lens board itself is usually flat, roughly square and made of a rigid material, usually metal, wood or plastic. It is opaque and fits snugly to prevent light from entering the camera body (or exiting an enlarger) except through the lens.

== Size and format ==
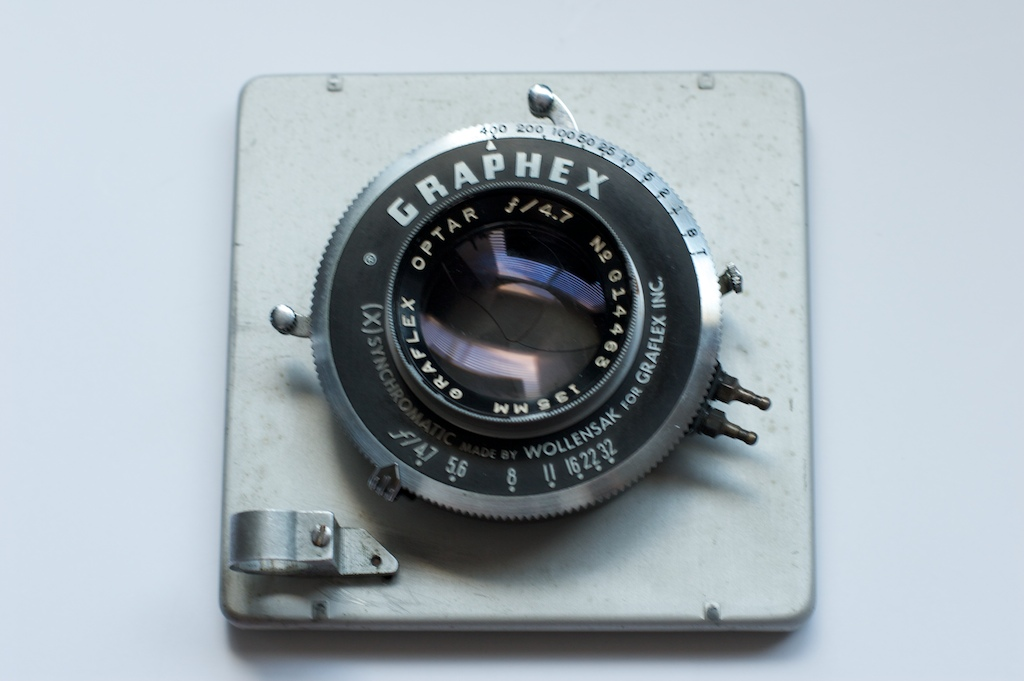
135mm Optar lens mounted on a #0 Speed Graphic lens board

The overall size and shape of the lens board depends on the camera or enlarger, but many brands have standard formats for their different models of camera, and Linhof's style of lens board has become an informal standard for many modern view cameras.

Lens boards are typically between 1 and 4 millimeters in thickness, and will have a hole at the center allowing lenses to be fastened, usually using a threaded retaining ring, or sometimes the board itself is threaded. While most lens boards are flat, some are recessed to accommodate wider focal length lenses which must be positioned closer to the film plane. A recessed lens board effectively reduces the flange focal distance of a camera.

Some cameras will use screws to secure the lens board to the front standard of the view camera, but most are secured by one or more locking levers or tabs to allow tool-less removal of the lens board. Many boards have a recessed lip around the outer edge, to help ensure light cannot enter the camera, and the inner surface of most lens boards is painted matte black to keep light inside the camera from reflecting off the board and interfering with the projected image.

=== Lens mounting ===
Depending on the size and focal length of the lens the board is to accommodate, a hole of a specific diameter is cut in the center of the lens board to accommodate the shutter assembly. Lens boards are typically sold pre-drilled by the camera manufacturer, however, if no replacement lens board is available, then one can be custom fabricated by a machinist.

Lenses are fitted to a lens board by placing the shutter assembly through the front of the board and securing it in place by threading retaining ring to the rear of the shutter. A front lens element will thread onto the mounted shutter and if necessary, a second lens element will thread onto the rear of the mounted shutter.

Enlargers do not use a shutter in the lens mechanism, and so the lens is mounted directly to the lens board.

Nearly all leaf shutters for large format cameras made since the 1990s are manufactured by the Nidec Copal Corporation, therefore the diameter of hole drilled is commonly referred to as the ‘Copal Number’.

The Copal sizes are as follows:

- Copal #0 - 34.6 mm
- Copal #1 - 41.6 mm
- Copal #3 – 65 mm
- Copal #3s - 64.5 mm

The origin Compur and Compound sizes are as follows:

- Compur #00 - 26.3 mm
- Compur #0 - 34.6 mm
- Compur #1 - 41.6 mm
- Compur #2 - 52.5 mm (there were different versions like Compur II and Compur II 5/2)
- Compur #3 - 65.0 mm
- Compound Dagor - 38.0 mm
- Compound #3 Hülse 7 - 63.2 mm
- Compound #4 Hülse 9 - 69.1 mm
- Compound #4 Hülse 10 - 80.0 mm
- Compound #5 Hülse 12 - 93.4 mm

== Other uses ==
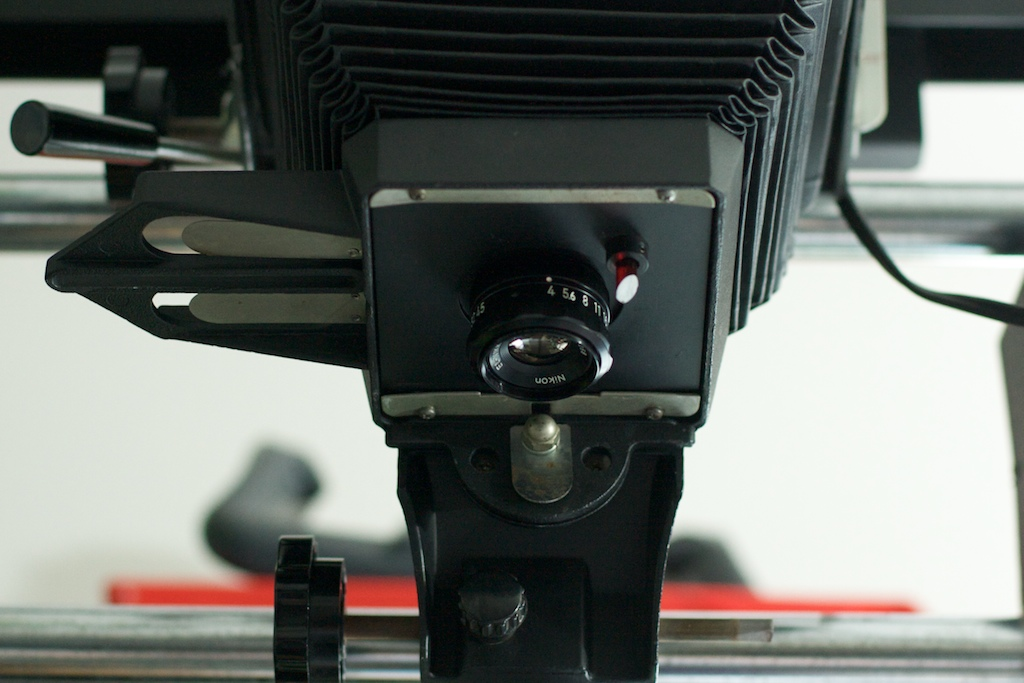
Enlarging lens mounted on a Besseler 45M enlarger

Lens boards are used in photographic enlargers to secure an enlarging lens to the focus stage of the device.

Similar to large format photographic view cameras, a lens board is utilized by some reprographic cameras in the printing industry.

Lens boards may also be used by some medical and scientific imaging devices.

== See also ==
- Photographic lens
- Lens mount
- S-mount (CCTV lens)
