= Minolta STF 135mm f/2.8 T4.5 =

Minolta STF 135mm f/2.8 [T4.5]
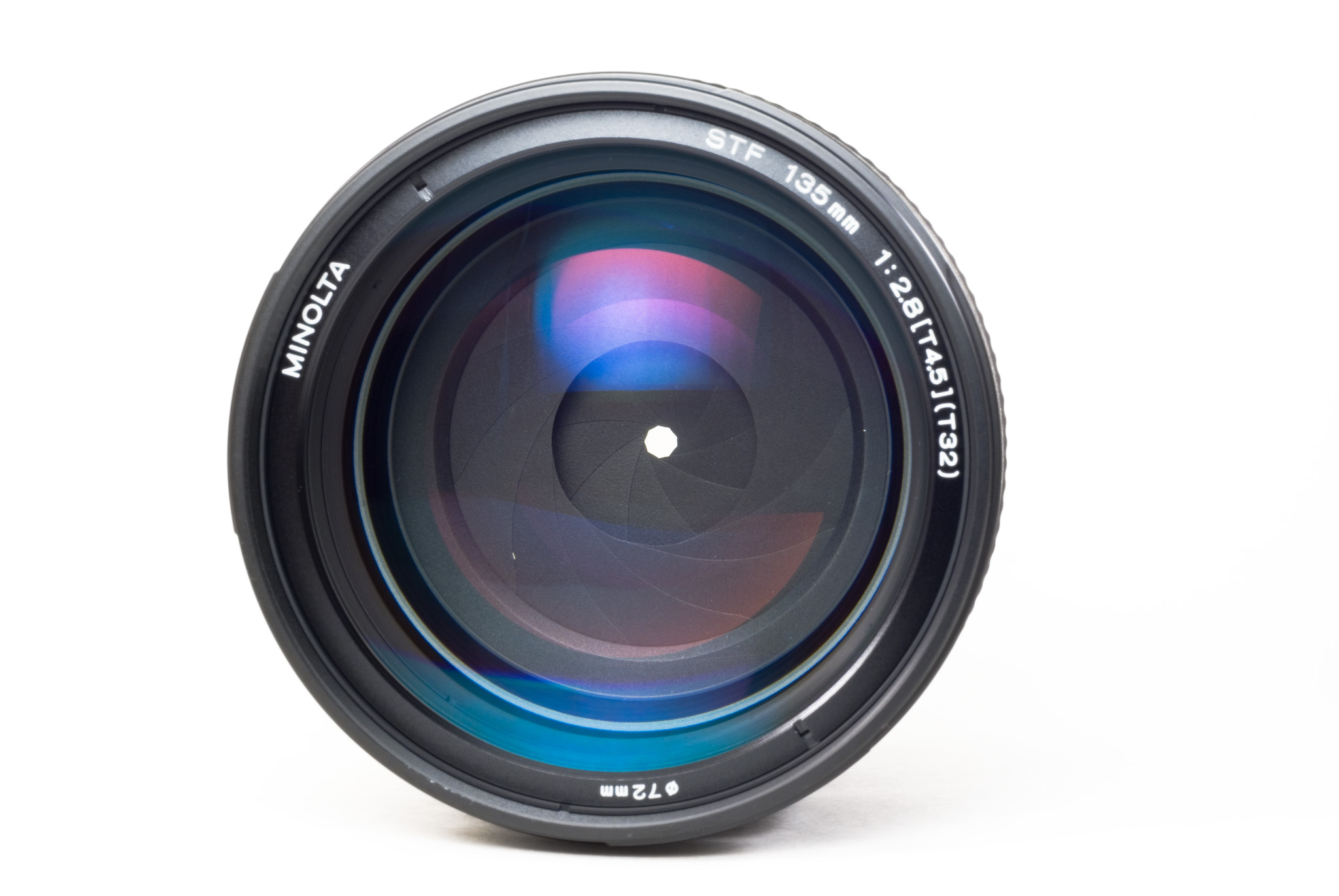
- Maker: Minolta, Sony

Technical data
- Type: Special Prime
- Focal length: 135mm
- Aperture (max/min): f/2.8 [T4.5] - f/32
- Close focus distance: 87 cm
- Max. magnification: 1/4
- Diaphragm blades: 9/10 circular
- Construction: 8 elements in 6 groups

Features
- Ultrasonic motor: No No
- Macro capable: No No
- Unique features: Smooth Trans Focus
- Application: Smooth Bokeh

Physical
- Weight: 730 g
- Filter diameter: 72 mm

Accessories
- Lens hood: Bayonet

Angle of view
- Diagonal: 18.2°

History
- Introduction: 1999
- Successor: Minolta version succeeded by Sony version in 2006

Retail info
- MSRP: 1200 USD (as of 2006)

Originally produced by Minolta, and currently produced by Sony, the STF 135mm f/2.8 [T4.5] is a photographic lens compatible with cameras using the Minolta AF and Sony α A-mount. STF stands for Smooth Trans Focus, in reference to its special optical system, which is intended to smooth the transition between the plane of focus and out-of-focus areas in the image. This is accomplished by the use of an apodization filter that provides the high-quality bokeh effect. The lens is not a soft-focus lens.

The STF lens is a manual focus-only lens. This lens is the only genuinely Minolta/Sony A-mount lens produced without autofocus capability. It is also the sole such lens having an aperture ring.

Apodization is a process in spatial signal processing which can enhance resolution by reducing the secondary maxima in the diffraction pattern of the lens' aperture. The STF lens features an optical apodization filter in form of a neutral-gray tinted concave lens element near the lens' diaphragm modulating the intensity profiles of the circles of confusion in such a way as to become truly Gaussian. Thereby, it is also deemed to improve the "bokeh" of the lens, that is the character of the image in the out-of-focus areas.

The lens offers two separate diaphragms; one nine-bladed circular diaphragm, controlled by the camera when the lens is set to auto mode ("A"), and one ten-bladed perfectly circular diaphragm, which is controlled by the lens' aperture ring when set to manual settings T4.5 to T6.7.

The f-number in this lens refers to the effective aperture opening and determines the depth-of-field produced by its use. The T-number refers to the amount of light, which passes through the lens and is collected on the film or sensor, as such, transmission stops are used by the camera to calculate exposure. Both values differ significantly, because the tinted glass element remains in the optical path all the time. Fully open, the difference amounts to 1.5 EV, however, the difference will become smaller as the aperture is closed, just as the smoothening effect will become reduced.

The optical effect can be emulated by combining depth-of-field bracketing with multi exposure, as implemented in the Minolta Maxxum 7's STF function.

In 2014, Fujifilm announced a lens utilizing a similar apodization filter in the Fujinon XF 56mm F1.2 R APD lens.

In 2017, Sony added the Sony FE 100mm F2.8 STF GM OSS (SEL-100F28GM) for E-mount cameras.

Minolta STF 135mm f/2.8 [T4.5]

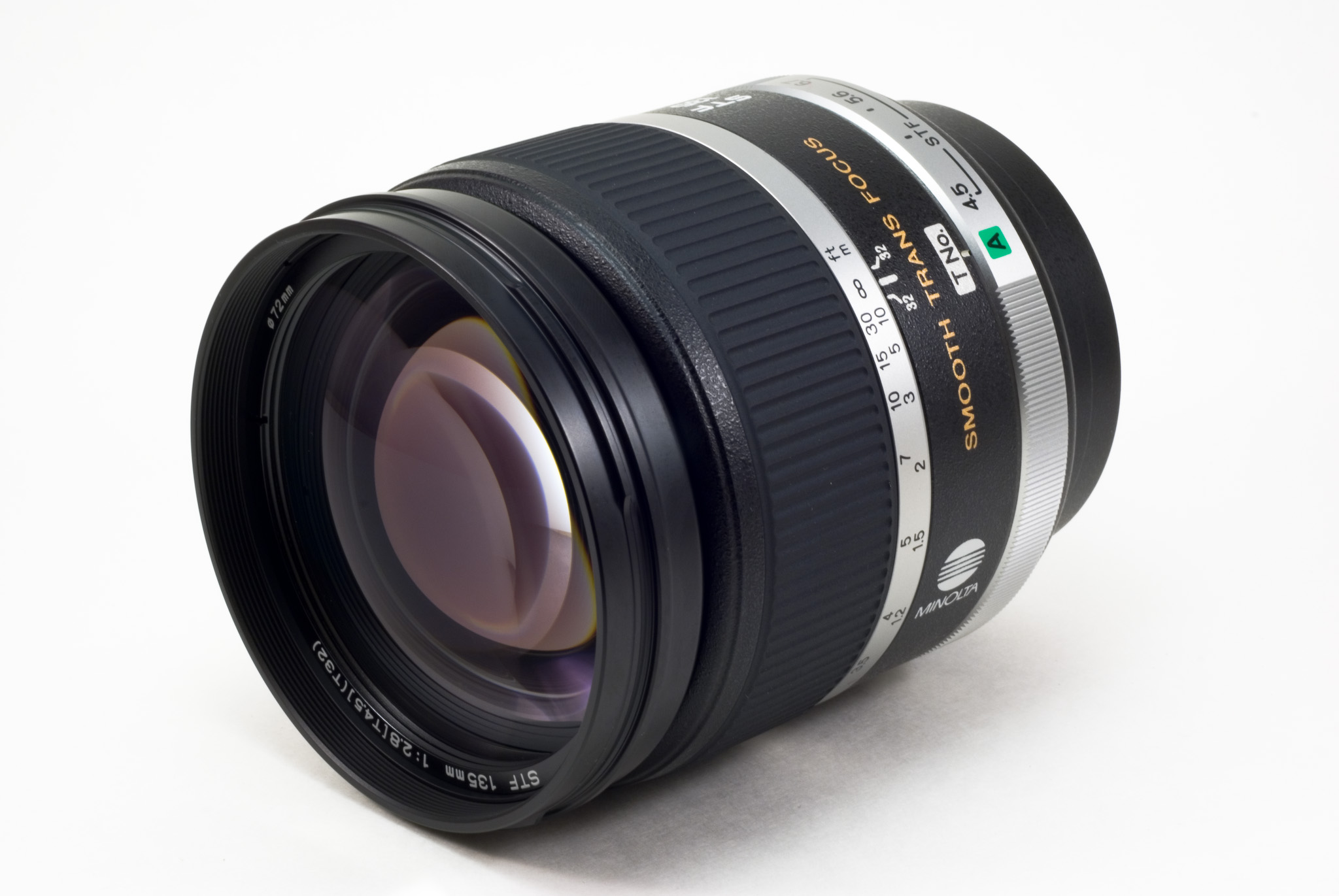
Minolta STF 135mm/2.8 [4.5] lens

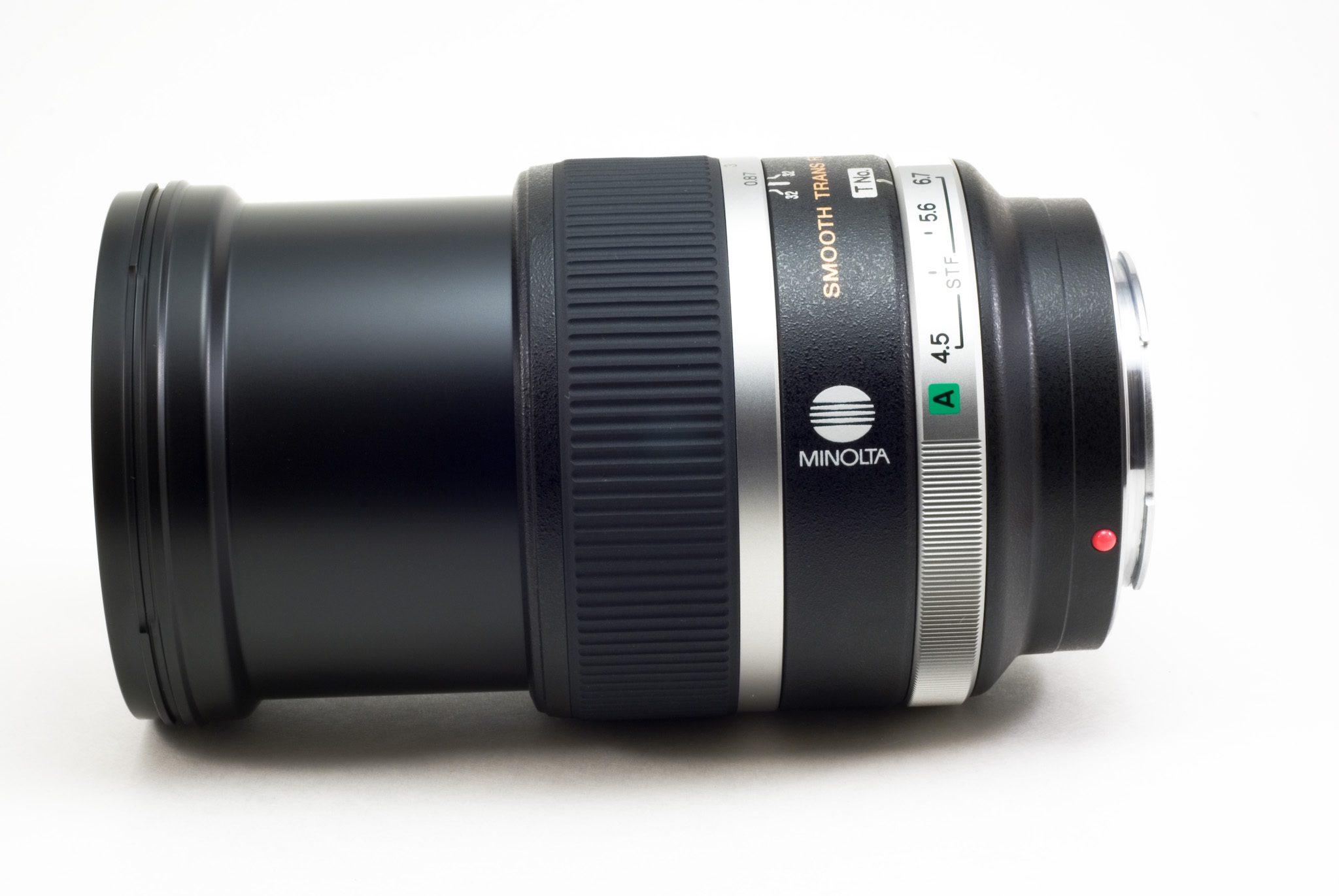
Minolta STF 135mm/2.8 [4.5] focus extension design

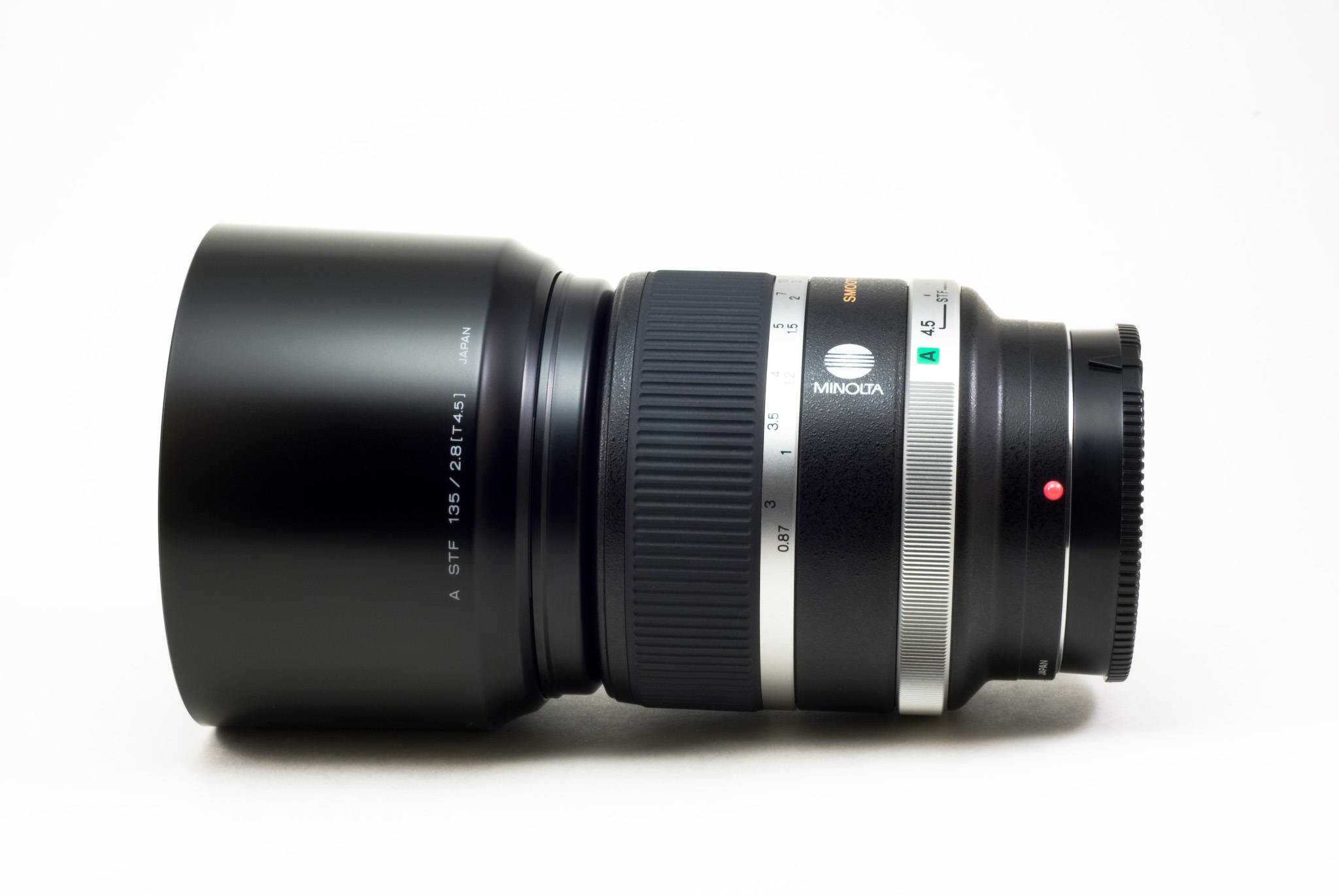
Minolta STF 135mm/2.8 [4.5] lens hood

== See also ==
- Bracketing
- Autobracketing
- Multiple exposure
- List of Minolta A-mount lenses
