= Smooth Trans Focus =

Photographic lens technology

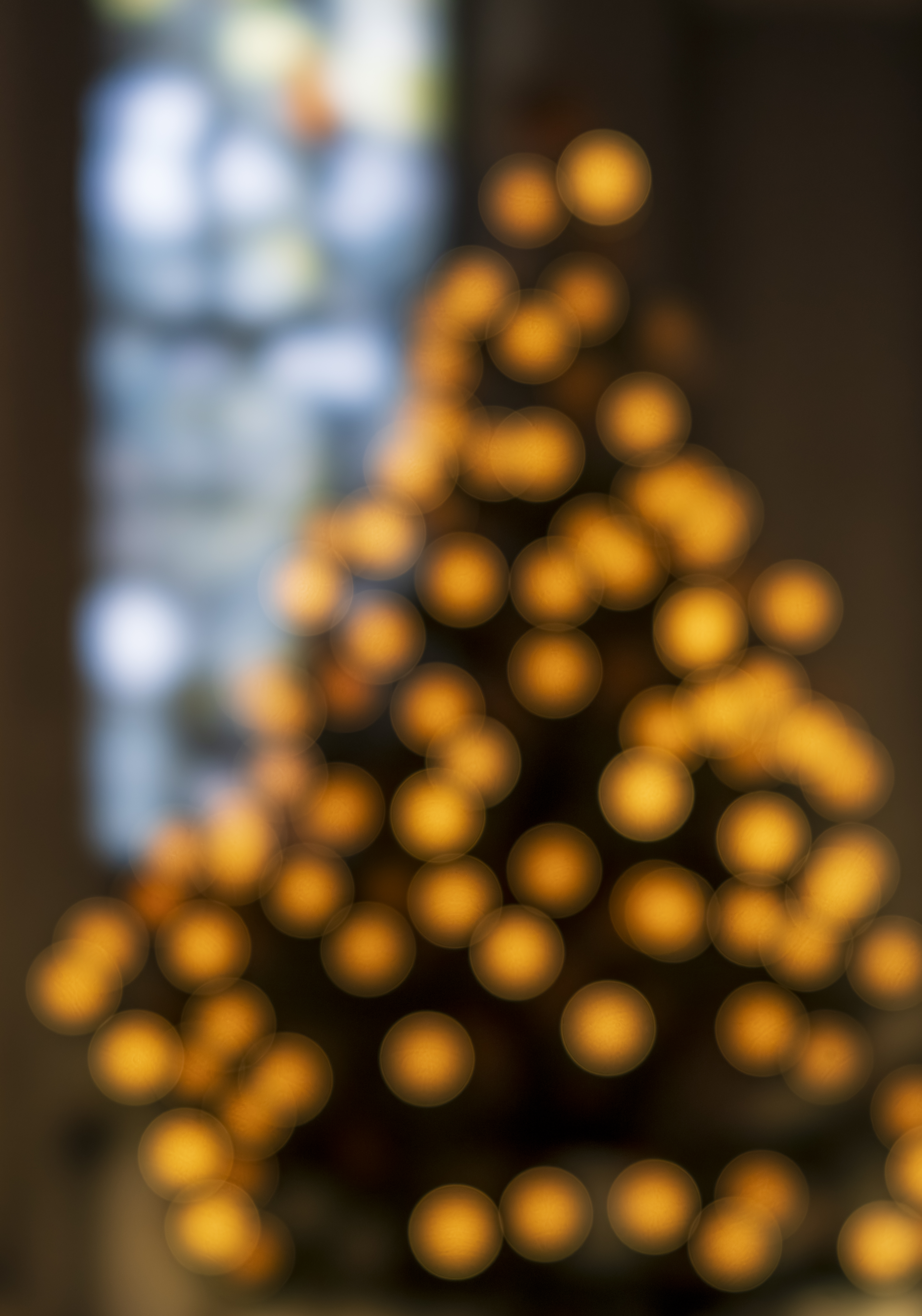
Smooth Trans Focus with bokeh discs

The Smooth Trans Focus (STF) technology in photographic lenses uses an apodization filter to realize notably smooth bokeh with rounded out-of-focus highlights in both the foreground and background. This is accomplished by utilizing a concave neutral-gray tinted lens element next to the aperture blades as apodization filter, a technology originally invented (and patented) by Minolta in the 1980s, and first implemented in a commercially available lens in 1999. In contrast to soft focus lenses, STF lenses render a perfectly sharp image in the focus plane.

Lenses featuring Smooth Trans Focus technology:

- Minolta STF 135mm F2.8 [T4.5] (introduced 1999)
- Sony α STF 135mm F2.8 [T4.5] (SAL-135F28) (introduced 2006)
- Sony FE 100mm F2.8 STF GM OSS (SEL-100F28GM) (introduced 2017)

== See also ==
- STF function (an emulation of the effect in the Minolta Maxxum 7)
- Fujinon XF 56mm F1.2 R APD (a similar lens introduced by Fujifilm in 2014)
- Venus Optics Laowa 105mm f/2 Smooth Trans Focus (a similar lens introduced by Venus Optics in 2016)
- f-stop
- T-stop
