= Venus Optics Laowa 105mm f/2 Smooth Trans Focus =

Laowa 105mm F2 STF Bokeh Dreamer
- Maker: Venus Optics
- Lens mount(s): Canon EF, Nikon AI, Pentax K, Sony A, Sony E

Technical data
- Type: Prime
- Focus drive: manual focus
- Focal length: 105mm
- Image format: 35mm full-frame
- Aperture (max/min): f/2.0 - 22.0, T3.2 - T8
- Close focus distance: 0.90 metres (3.0 ft)
- Max. magnification: 1:7 (0.14x)
- Diaphragm blades: F-stop: 8, 9 or 14 (depending on production date), T-stop: 14
- Construction: 11 elements in 8 groups

Features
- Manual focus override: Yes Yes
- Weather-sealing: No No
- Lens-based stabilization: No No
- Aperture ring: Yes Yes
- Unique features: Smooth Trans Focus
- Application: Portrait

Physical
- Max. length: 98.9 millimetres (3.89 in)
- Diameter: 76.0 millimetres (2.99 in)
- Weight: 745 grams (1.642 lb)
- Filter diameter: 67mm

History
- Introduction: 2016

Retail info
- MSRP: $699 USD

The Venus Optics Laowa 105mm F2 Smooth Trans Focus lens is a smooth trans focus full-frame prime lens for Canon EF, Nikon AI, Sony A, Sony E, and Pentax K mounts, announced by Venus Optics in September 2016. It is marketed as the "Bokeh Dreamer" lens.

Though designed for full frame, the lens can be used on APS-C camera bodies, with an equivalent full-frame field-of-view of approximately 136.5mm - 157.5mm. Canon EF-Mount versions are optionally equipped with a focus confirmation chip.

== Optical properties ==
The lens features an apodization filter element within the lens itself which lends itself to producing creamy smooth bokeh at the expense of light gathering capabilities. The lens features the bokeh of an f/2.0 lens but maintains the light-gathering of a T/3.2 lens, requiring brighter lighting conditions from the environment to compensate.

== See also ==
- List of third-party E-mount lenses
- Sony FE 100mm F2.8 STF GM OSS
