= Venus Optics =

Manufacturer of innovative photographic lenses

- Native name: Anhui ChangGeng Optics Technology Co., Ltd.
- Type: Private
- Industry: Photographic lens design; Optics; Entertainment industry
- Founded: 2013
- Founder: Dayong Li
- Headquarters: Hefei, Anhui
- Key people: Dayong Li
- Products: Camera lenses
- Number of employees: 131 (2019)
- Website: www.venuslens.net

Venus Optics (Anhui ChangGeng Optics Technology Co., Ltd.) is a Chinese manufacturer of photographic lenses, specialized in the design of innovative macro, wide angle, shift and f/0.95 lenses. Headquarters and production are in Hefei, Anhui province, while sales and marketing offices are located in Hong Kong and the United States of America. They are currently marketing the lenses using the brand Laowa (Chinese: 老蛙; lit. 'old frog').

== Company ==
Venus Optics was founded in 2013. Founder, managing director and chief developer is Dayong Li who graduated in opto-electronic engineering from the Beijing Institute of Technology.

The company develops and produces innovative photographic lenses under the brand name Laowa ('old frog').

Laowa's optics designer, Dayong Li, is believed to be the optics designer of Tamron, the reputable camera lens manufacturer from Japan. He was heavily involved in numerous Tamron's project development including the popular 24-70mm f/2.8 and 70-200mm f/2.8.

== Lenses ==
The first lens was the 60 mm f/2.8 2 x Ultra Macro, a full frame lens with a magnification factor of 2:1 that could also be focused to infinity which is unique. In the same year, Venus Optics released the widest angle macro lens to offer a 1:1 magnification ratio, the 15 mm f/4 Wide Angle Macro. The small focal length allows to include the background details (e.g., where and how the subject lives) in the photo. Due to physical reasons, the working distance in the macro range is rather short (at 1:1, focusing distance is 12.2 cm resulting in a working distance of only 4.7 mm). In the meantime, Venus Optics have released unique lenses mainly in the fields of ultra macro and rectilinear and/or fast ultra wide angle lenses for full frame, APS-C, MFT, and Fujifilm G-Mount (see table).

Besides optics for photography company also produce cine lenses. Traditional and anamorphic.

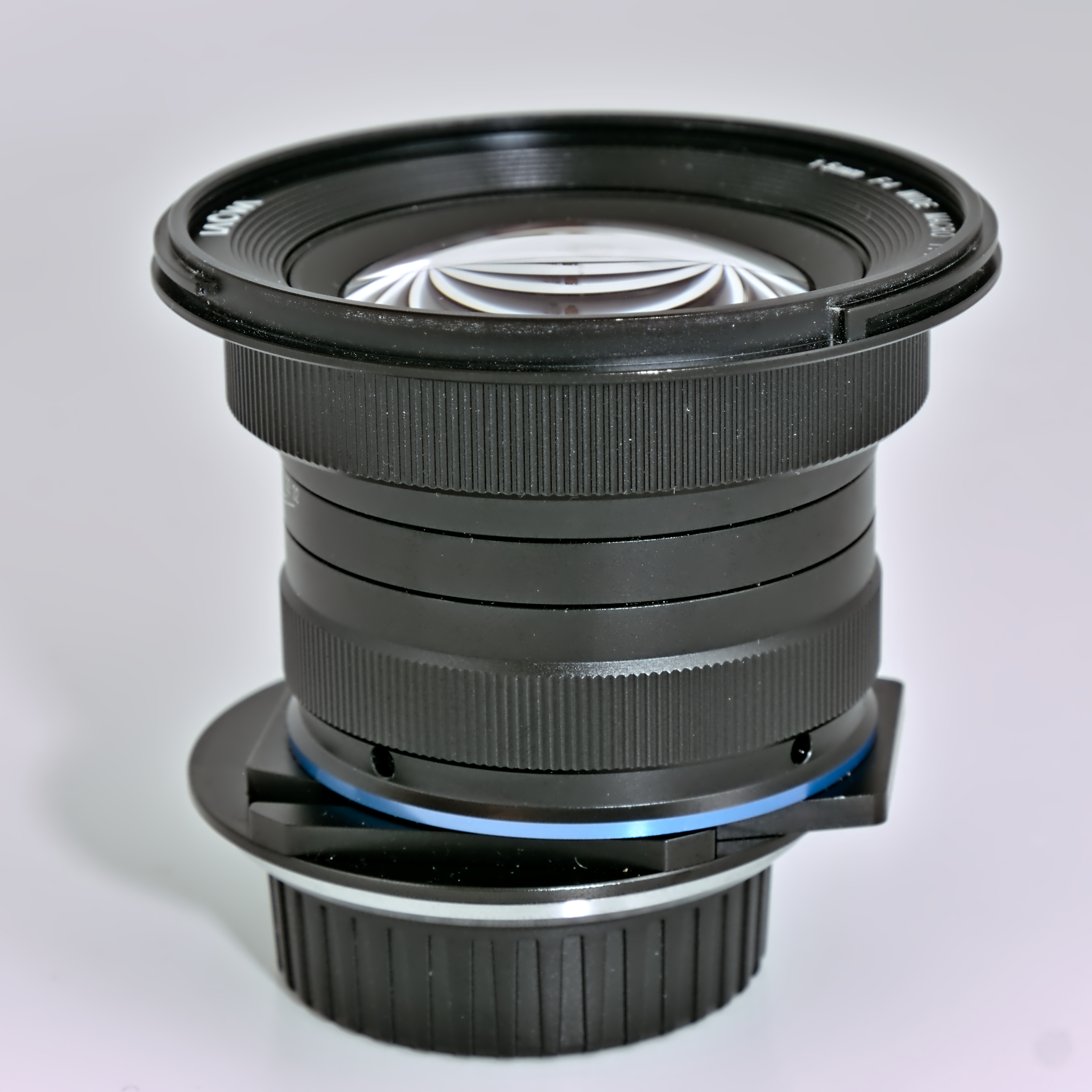
Laowa 15 mm f/4 Wide Angle Macro with shift function by Venus Optics

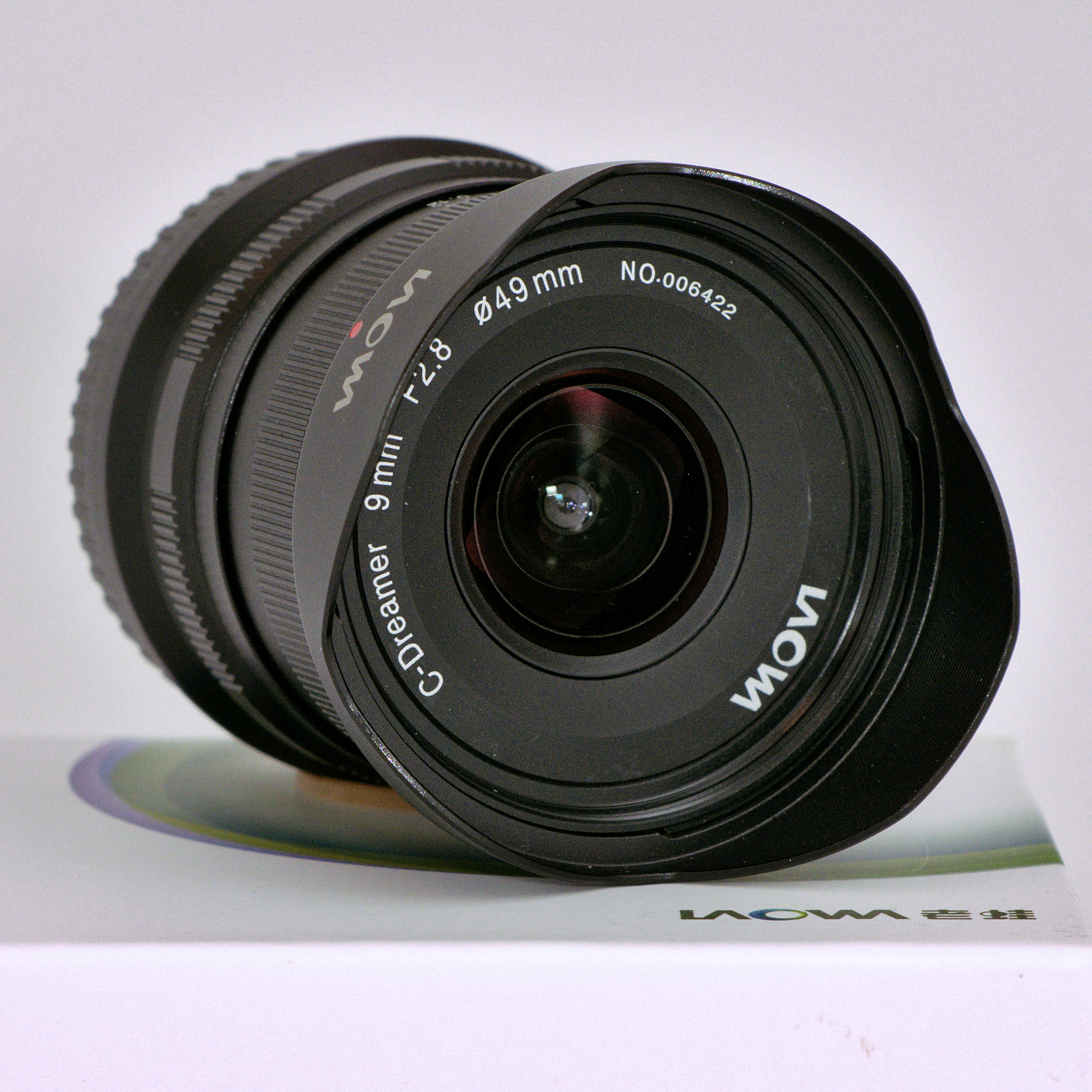
Laowa 9 mm f/2.8 super wide angle lens for APS-C, introduced in 2015

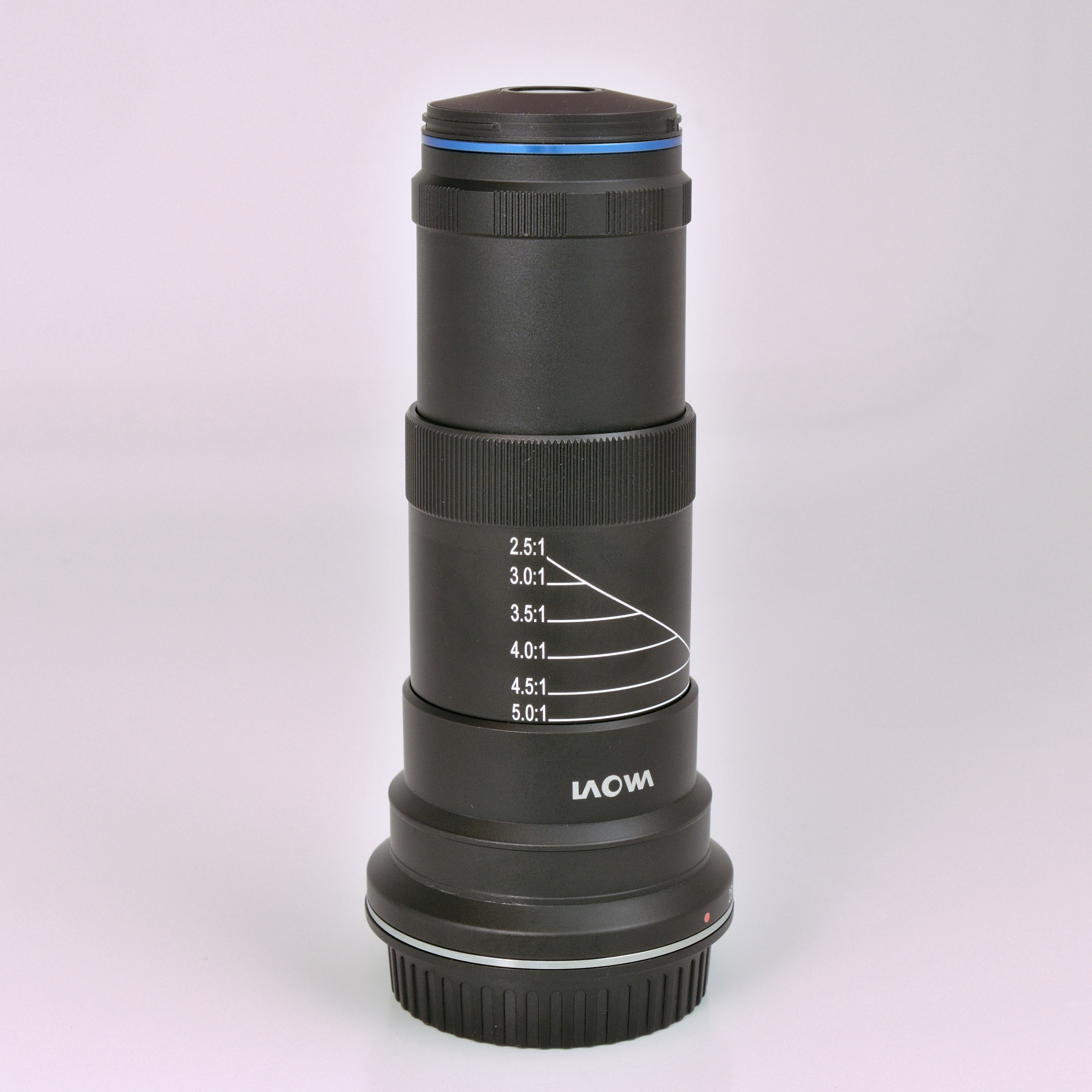
Laowa 25 mm 2.5-5x ultra macro lens for full frame, introduced in 2018

Laowa lenses (July 2020)
Focal length [mm]	Max. aperture	Image sensor format	Focal length, full frame equivalent [mm]	Name	Year of introduction	Unique feature at date of introduction
4	f/2.8	MFT	8	Fisheye MFT	2019	Smallest focal length for MFT. Ultracompact and thus suited for drone photography.
7.5	f/2	MFT	15	MFT C-Dreamer	2017	Combination of fast lens, ultra wide angle lens, and rectilinear projection for MFT. An ultra light version is available for drone photography.
9	f/2.8	APS-C	13.5	Zero-D (C-Dreamer, C&D-Dreamer)	2018	Combination of fast lens, ultra wide angle lens, and rectilinear projection w/ negligible distortion for APS-C. Ultracompact construction. A MFT version is available.
9	t/2.9	APS-C	13.5	Zero-D Cine	2020	Ultra wide angle cine lens with rectilinear projection and negligible distortion for APS-C.
9	f/5.6	Full frame	9	Zero-D (W-Dreamer)	2020	Widest angle rectilinear full frame lens with negligible distortion.
10-18	f/4.5-5.6	Full frame	10-18	C-Dreamer	2018	Greatest zoom factor of a full frame wide angle lens.
12	f/2.8	Full frame	12	Zero-D (D-Dreamer)	2016	Combination of fast lens, ultra wide angle lens, and rectilinear projection w/ negligible distortion for full frame format.
12	t/2.9	Full frame	12	Zero-D Cine	2020	Cine version of the 12 mm f/2.8 Zero-D. Field of view is 122°. Close to being distortion-free. Compact and relatively light for a cine lens. Minimum focusing distance is 7" (18 cm).
15	t/2.1	Full frame	15	Zero-D Cine	2020	Wide angle cine lens with rectilinear projection and negligible distortion.
15	f/4	Full frame	15	Wide Angle Macro (W-Dreamer)	2015	Widest angle macro lens. Shift function for landscsape format.
15	f/4.5	Full frame	15	Zero-D	2020	World's Widest shift lens for full frame. +/-11mm shift capability.
15	f/2	Full frame	15	Zero-D (D-Dreamer)	2017	Fastest 15 mm lens for full frame. Rectilinear projection, minimum distortion.
17	f/1.8	MFT	34	C-Dreamer	2019	Very compact and light weight lens (172 g) and thus also suited for aerial photography. Small minimum focus distance of 5.9″ (15 cm) enables close-up shots.
17	f/4	Fujifilm GFX	13.5	Ultra-Wide GFX Zero-D	2019	Widest angle lens for Fujifilm G-Mount. Rectilinear projection, minimum distortion.
24	f/14	Full frame	25	2x Macro Probe	2018	Novel concept. Allows for large distance between photographer and object. Can be immersed in aqueous media.
25	f/2.8	Full frame	25	2.5-5x Ultra Macro	2018	Most compact construction in this class with approximately 4 cm working distance (cf. Mitakon Zhongyi 20 mm f/2 4.5x Super Macro Lens and Canon MP-E 65 mm f/2.8 1–5x Macro).
60	f/2.8	Full frame	60	2x Ultra Macro	2015	First 2x macro lens that can be focused at infinity.
65	f/2.8	APS-C	97.5	2x Ultra Macro APO	2020	Apochromatic lens. Compact and lightweight APS-C version of the 100 mm 2x Ultra Macro f/2.8. Can also be focused at infinity.
100	f/2.8	Full frame	100	2x Ultra Macro APO	2019	Apochromatic lens. Laowa's second 2x macro lens after the 60 mm f/2.8 that can be focused at infinity. Minimum chromatic aberration.
105	f/2 (t/3.2)	Full frame	105	Smooth Trans Focus (STF)	2016	Built in apodization element for creative photography.

Most Laowa lenses (an exception is e.g., the 100 mm f/2,8 2x Ultra Macro APO) are purely manual lenses. There is no communication between the camera body and the lens, hence, no transfer of Exif data, no autofocus function, no lens-based image stabilization (OIS), and no automatic aperture control. However, autofocus plays a minor role in macro and wide angle photography. Auto focus bracketing is not possible with manual lenses. The company does not exclude the development of more lenses with electronics in them.

== Advertising ==
Since 2017, Laowa had organised multiple international marketing campaigns bearing its slogan "New Idea, New Fun".

=== Competitions ===
Laowa has used competition as an advertising vehicle to encourage its users to share their image. The company first started organising Laowa Photo Competition in 2017. Initially focusing on photos from its own lenses, and later it also allow images taken with other brand's lenses. As of 2021, there are other brands collaborate in the 5th Laowa Photo Competition and sponsored prize for the event.

=== Laowa Video Marathon ===
Laowa Video Marathon is an invitation-only program launched by Laowa in 2021. It has gathered 10 videographers and YouTubers, including Motoaki(Aki from Japan), Jason Morris, Helena Gudkova(cameragirlhelena), Yeyoph and more. The program consists of 10 one-minute long short films. Each video's beginning would match the ending shot from the last video.

=== Laowagrapher ===
In early 2021, Laowa interviewed multiple up-and-coming photographers and introduced them as "Laowagrapher". It consists group of photographers from all over the world.

== See also ==
- List of photographic equipment makers
