= Angénieux =

French camera lens manufacturer

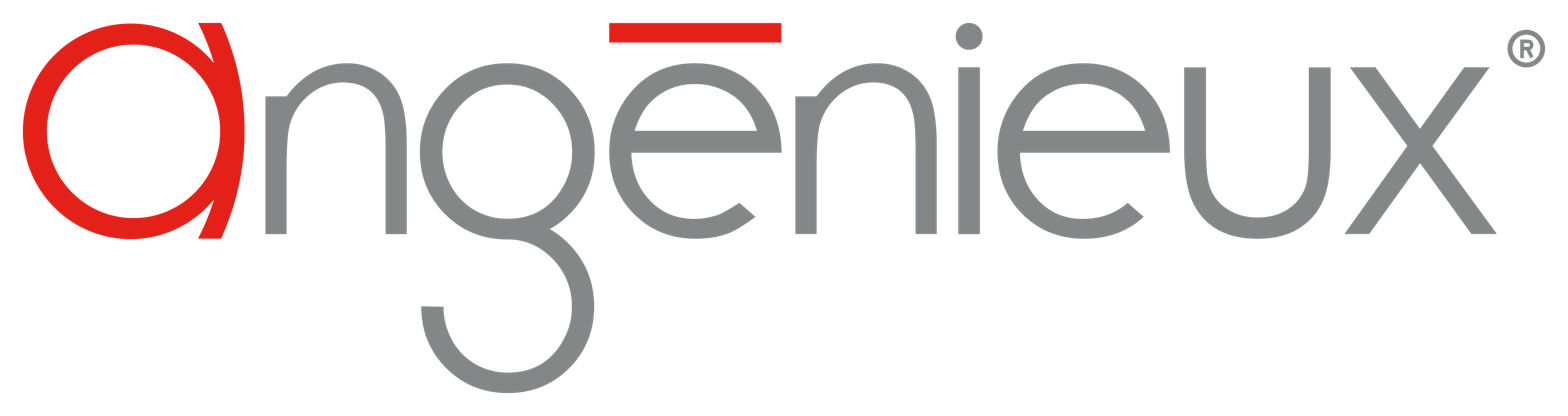
- Industry: Lenses (zoom), complex optical systems)
- Founded: 1935; 90 years ago
- Founder: Pierre Angénieux
- Headquarters: Saint-Héand, France
- Key people: André Masson Gérard Corbasson; Denis Suverran; Philippe Parain Pierre Andurand
- Parent: Thales Group - 99.99% (in 2007)
- Website: www.angenieux.com

Angénieux is a French manufacturer of photographic and cinematographic lenses. The main markets are cinema, television, space travel and medicine. The company is part of the Thales Group, which represents Angénieux in 48 countries. The company is headquartered in Saint-Héand, near Saint-Étienne in France.

Founded in 1935 by Pierre Angénieux, the company is established in Saint-Héand (Loire), the birthplace of its founder located near Saint-Étienne. His original specialty is the design and manufacture of precision optics for film and photography. Ousted from the amateur market in the 1960s, it refocused its activity on two productions that have made its reputation: spatial optics and zooms.

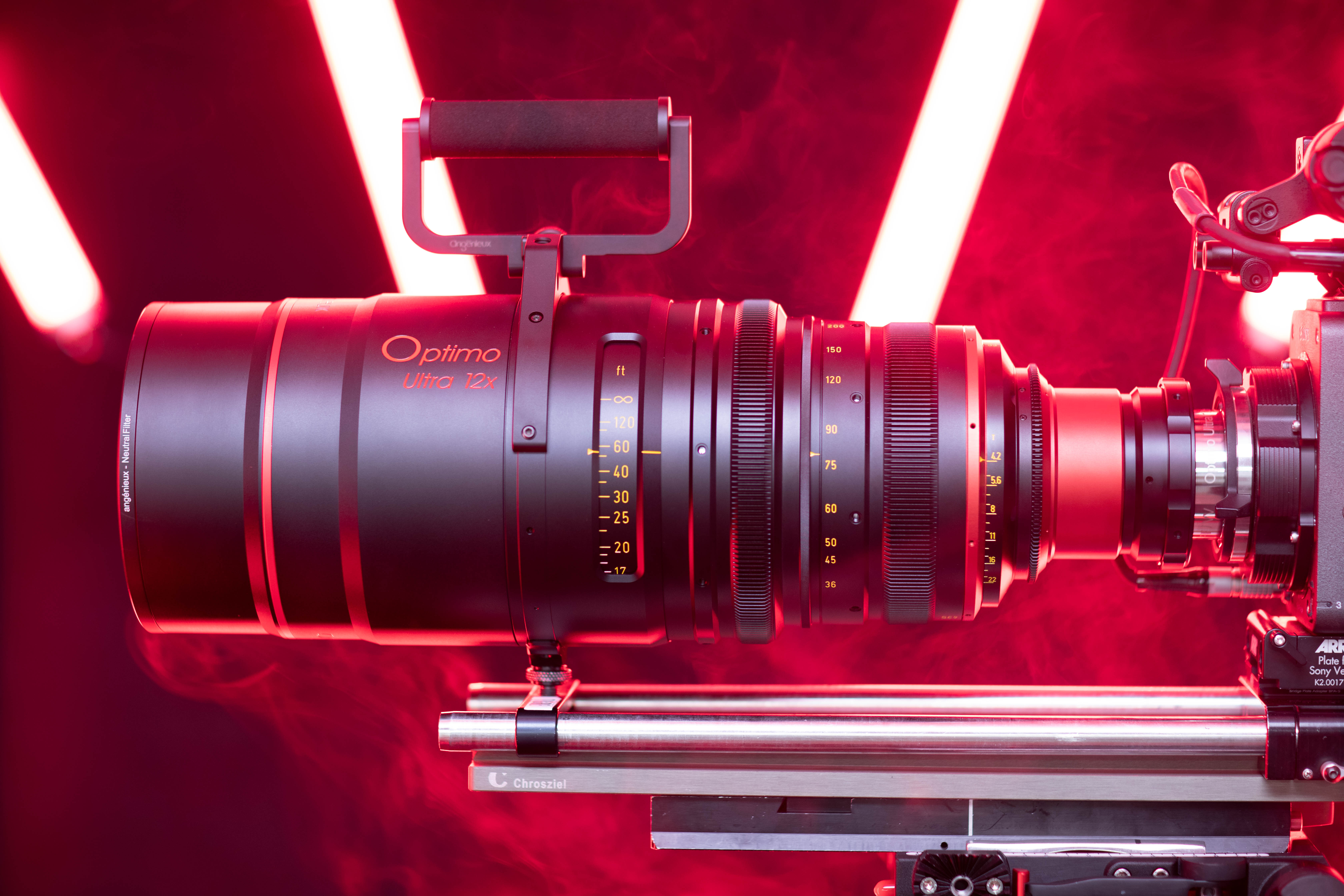
Angenieux Optimo Ultra 12X cinematic lens

Now part of the Thales Group, Thales Angénieux — since 2017 establishment of Thales Land & Air Systems — also designs, develops and produces military optics, mainly night vision binoculars.

== List of products ==
=== Optimo series lenses ===
==== Optimo Prime Series ====
Available 12 models by focal length: 18, 21, 24, 28, 32, 40, 50, 60, 75, 100, 135, & 200 MM

==== Optimo Anamorphic ====
- Optimo Anamorphic 56‑152 A2S - Standard Compact Anamorphic Zoom Lens
- Optimo Anamorphic 30‑72 A2S - Wide Angle Compact Anamorphic Zoom Lens
- Optimo Anamorphic 42-420 A2S - Version of Optimo 44-440 A2S with new image characteristics

==== Optimo Spherical ====
- Optimo Ultra Compact 21-56 FF — wide-angle compact spherical zoom lens
- Optimo Ultra Compact 37-102 FF — standard compact spherical zoom lens
- Optimo Ultra 12x FF/VV, S35 & U35 — for long-range cinema zoom
- Optimo 45‑120mm T2.8 — Telephoto Compact Spherical Zoom Lens
- Optimo 28‑76mm T2.6 — Standard Compact Spherical Zoom Lens
- Optimo 15-40mm T2.6 — Wide Angle Compact Spherical Zoom Lens
- Optimo 19.5‑94mm — Wide Angle Spherical Zoom Lens with Large Imaging Size
- Optimo 24-290mm T2.8 (discontinued)

==== Optimo Style Spherical ====
- Optimo Style 25‑250 — 10x Spherical Zoom Lens
- Optimo Style 48-130 — Lightweight Compact Mid-Range Tele Zoom
- Optimo Style 30‑76 — Standard Compact Spherical Zoom Lens

==== Type EZ Series ====
- Type EZ-1 FF/VV & S35 (Standard)
- Type EZ-2 FF/VV & S35 (Wide)
