= Cine lens =

Lenses designed for cinematography

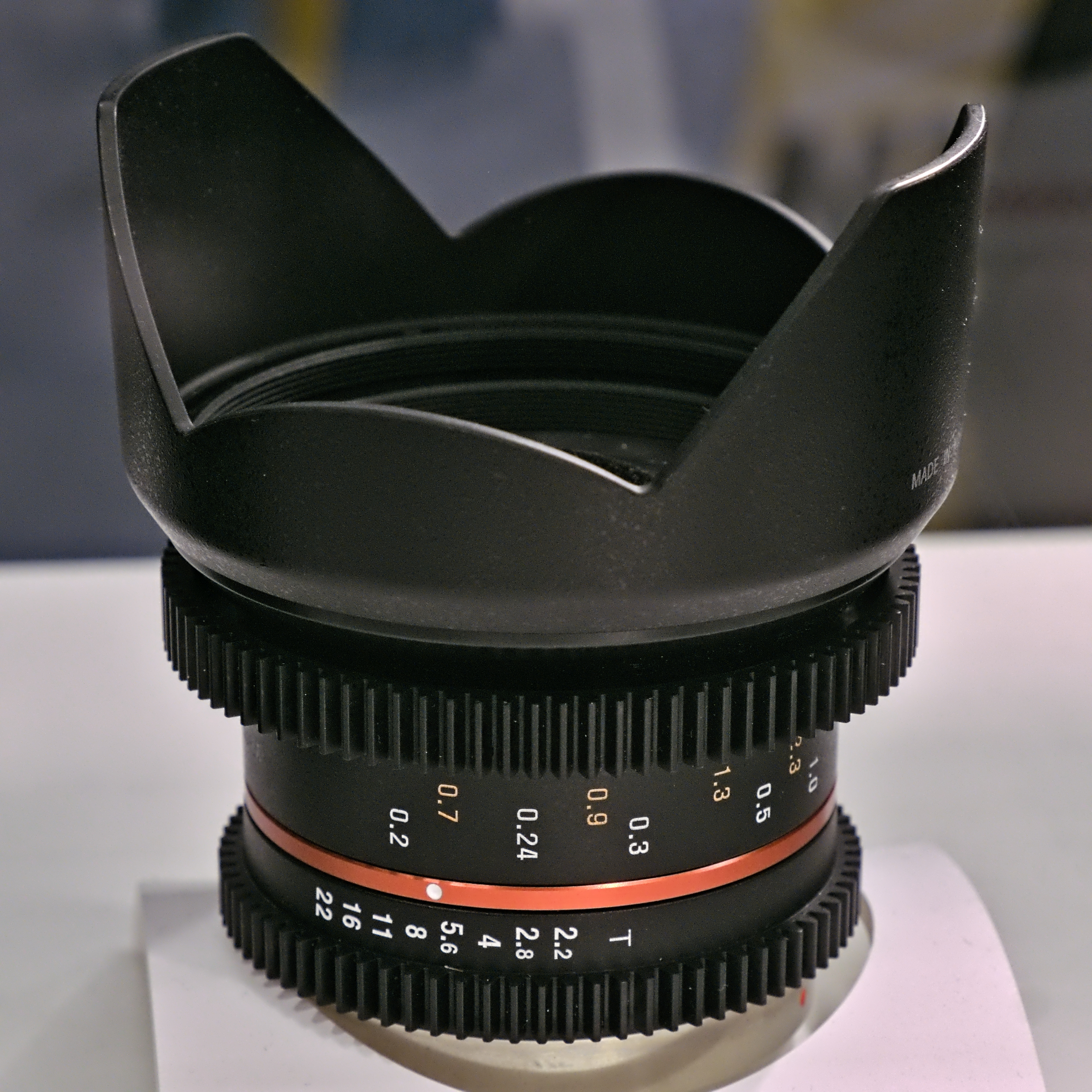
Samyang 12mm T2.2 cine lens

Cine lenses or cinema lenses are lenses that are designed especially for cinematography, and whose main distinguishing feature from conventional photographic lenses is the "clickless" or "declicked" aperture ring. Markings on the aperture ring indicate T-stops rather than f-stops as used in still photography. Furthermore, it is a desirable characteristic for cine lenses to occupy the same form factor as each other so as to be readily interchangeable and identical in operation. This particularly applies to lenses with different focal lengths. In order to maximise interchangeability, lenses within a series of cine lenses are often identical in transmittance of light (maximum T-stop).

Anamorphic lenses for cinematography may also be classified as cine lenses.

== Key characteristics ==
Cine lenses are distinguished from conventional photographic lenses by several technical and practical features tailored to the demands of professional film and video production.

=== Aperture and exposure control ===
The aperture ring on a cine lens is "declicked" (also called "clickless"), meaning it rotates smoothly and continuously without the tactile detents found on still photography lenses. This allows a camera operator or focus puller to perform smooth, silent aperture transitions during a take without causing audible clicks in the audio recording. Aperture values on cine lenses are marked in T-stops rather than f-stops. While f-stops represent the theoretical light transmission based on the lens's geometry, T-stops are measured values of actual light transmission, accounting for internal reflections and absorption within the lens elements. This makes T-stops more reliable for matching exposure across different lenses on a production.

=== Focus breathing ===
A critical requirement for professional cine lenses is minimal or zero focus breathing — the apparent change in the angle of view as the lens is focused from one distance to another. In still photography this is generally inconsequential, but in motion picture production any shift in framing during a focus pull is clearly visible and considered unacceptable in most professional contexts. High-quality cine lenses are specifically engineered to suppress this effect.

=== Follow-focus compatibility and gear rings ===
Cine lenses typically feature external gear rings on both the focus and iris rings, machined to a standard pitch (most commonly 0.8 mod), allowing them to interface directly with follow focus systems, motors, and lens control systems (LCS). The focus ring itself is usually much wider than on a photographic lens and has a longer rotational throw — often 270° or more — to allow fine, precise manual focus adjustments, which is essential for the work of a focus puller.

=== Form factor and interchangeability ===
A defining goal in cine lens design is consistency of form factor across a set (or "suite") of lenses. Ideally, all lenses in a matched set share the same front diameter, the same position of the focus and iris gear rings, and the same overall length. This makes it straightforward to swap lenses during a shoot without having to readjust matte boxes, follow focus motors, or other rigged accessories. Within a matched set, lenses are also often matched for the same maximum T-stop value so that switching focal lengths does not require any exposure adjustment.

=== Parfocal zoom lenses ===
In addition to prime lenses, parfocal cine zoom lenses maintain their focus as the focal length is changed, unlike most photographic zoom lenses, which exhibit varifocal behaviour. This property is essential for zoom shots during a take, as it allows the camera operator to zoom while the subject remains in focus.

== Cine lenses for mirrorless and hybrid cameras ==
While traditionally the domain of large cinema cameras using PL mount or LPL mount systems, cine lenses have increasingly been adapted or purpose-designed for mirrorless and DSLR systems. Manufacturers such as Rokinon, Samyang Optics, Sigma Corp., and Venus Optics produce dedicated cine-style primes for mounts including Sony E-mount, Canon RF, Nikon Z, and Fujifilm X-mount. These lenses bring cine-oriented features — declicked aperture rings, gear rings, minimal focus breathing, and long focus throws — to smaller form-factor cameras used in independent filmmaking and video production.

Key video-oriented features highlighted by reviewers and lens guides for such lenses include minimal focus breathing, smooth focus ring action, consistent aperture across the zoom range (for zoom lenses), and parfocal design.

== Lens mounts ==
Professional cinema cameras use dedicated lens mounts designed for the large image circles and optical requirements of large-format and Super 35 sensors. The most prevalent professional cinema mount is the PL mount (Positive Lock), which is used on cameras by Arri, Sony, Canon, and others. The newer LPL mount offers a wider inner diameter to accommodate lenses designed for large-format sensors. For smaller productions or digital cinema cameras based on photographic sensor sizes, adapted photographic mounts such as Canon EF, Canon RF, Sony E/FE, and Nikon Z are common, sometimes via a lens adapter.

== Manufacturers ==
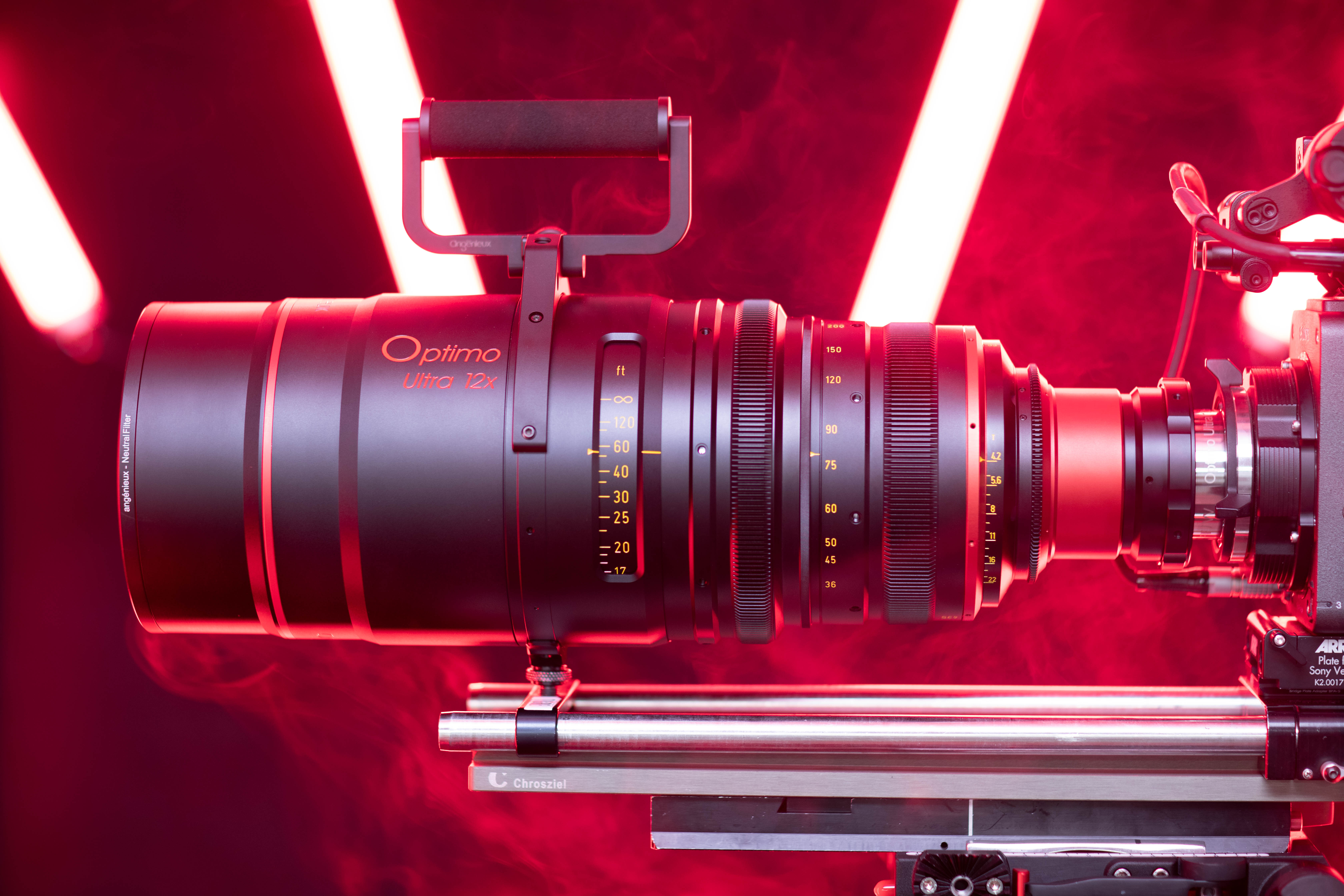
Angénieux Optimo Ultra 12X

The following companies produce cine lenses:

- Angénieux
- Arri
- Atlas Lens Co.
- Canon Inc.
- Cooke Optics
- Fujifilm
- Irix
- Leica
- Rokinon
- Samyang Optics
- Sigma Corp.
- Vantage®
- Zeiss
- Nitecore
- Venus Optics

== See also ==
- Anamorphic format
- T-stop
- Follow focus
- Lens mount
- ARRI PL mount
