= Bokode =

Data tags that are read out of focus

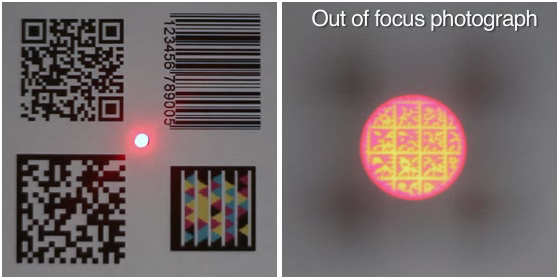
A Bokode tag between other bar codes, seen as a red dot in focus, but a large patterned circle out-of-focus.

A bokode is a type of data tag which holds much more information than a barcode over the same area. They were developed by a team led by Ramesh Raskar at the MIT Media Lab. Bokodes are intended to be read by any standard digital camera, focusing at infinity. With this optical setup, the tiny code appears large enough to read. Bokodes are readable from different angles and from 4 metres (13 ft) away.

The bokode pattern is a tiled series of Data Matrix codes. The name is a portmanteau of the words bokeh—a photographic term for defocus—and barcode. Rewritable bokodes are called bocodes. Bokodes are circular with a diameter of 3 millimetres (0.12 in). A bokode consists of an LED covered with a photomask and a lens. Powered bokodes are relatively expensive because of the LED and the power it requires. However, prototypes have been developed which function passively with reflected light like a typical barcode.

Bokodes convey a privacy advantage compared to radio-frequency identification (RFID) tags: in order to hide them, bokodes can be covered up with anything opaque to light, whereas RFID tags must be masked by material opaque to radio frequencies. RFID privacy is enough of a concern that shielding for RFID tags is common.

== See also ==
- QR Code
