= Fujinon XF 56mm F1.2 R =

Interchangeable camera lens announced by Fujifilm

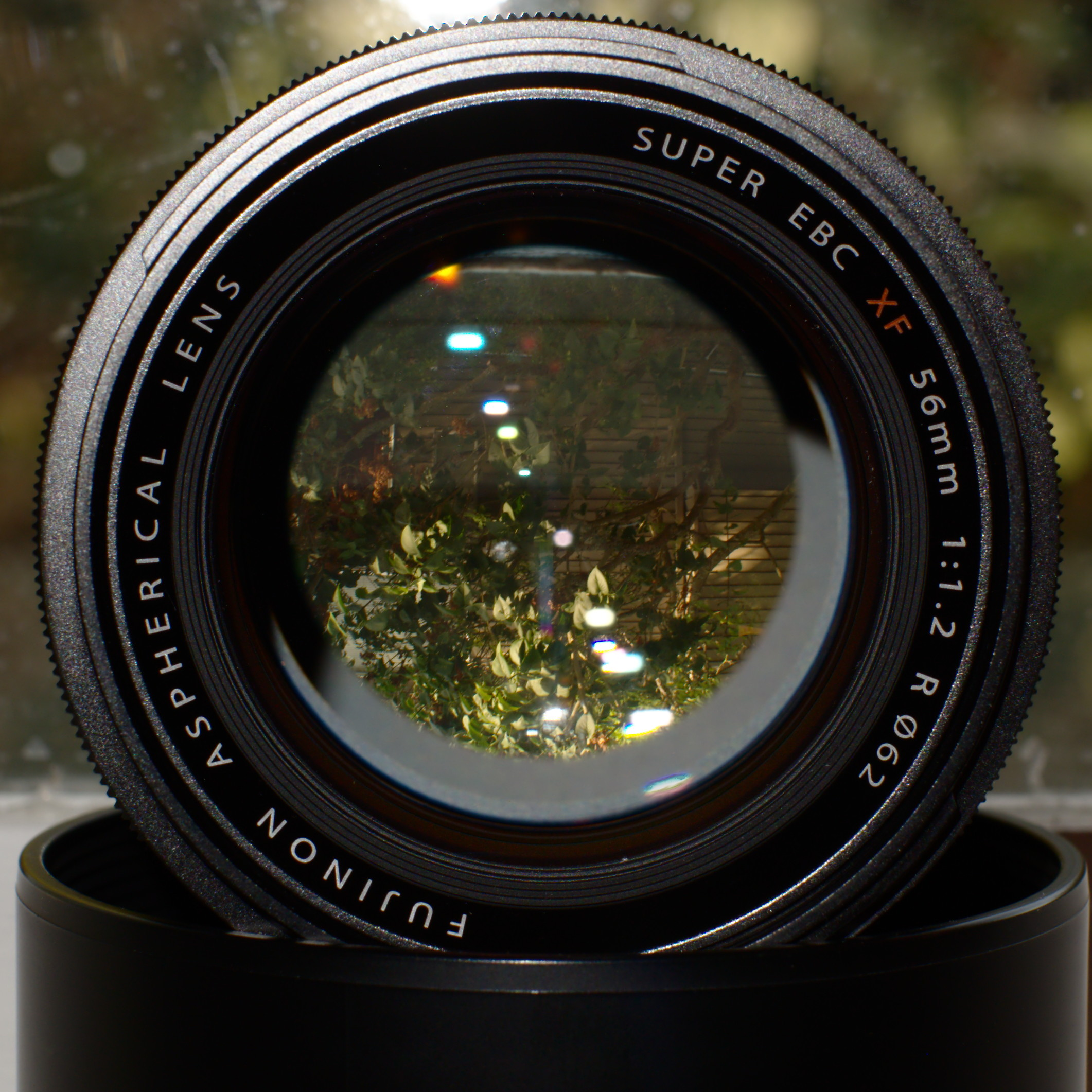
- Maker: Fujifilm
- Lens mount(s): Fujifilm X

Technical data
- Focus drive: Micromotor
- Focal length: 56mm
- Focal length (35mm equiv.): 84mm
- Aperture (max/min): f/1.2
- Close focus distance: 0.70 metres (2.3 ft)
- Max. magnification: 0.09
- Diaphragm blades: 7, rounded
- Construction: 11 elements in 8 groups

Features
- Weather-sealing: No No
- Lens-based stabilization: No No
- Aperture ring: Yes Yes
- Unique features: Double-sided aspheric element, two ED elements
- Application: Portrait

Physical
- Max. length: 70 millimetres (2.8 in)
- Diameter: 73 millimetres (2.9 in)
- Weight: 405 grams (0.893 lb)
- Filter diameter: 62mm

History
- Introduction: 2014

The Fujinon XF 56mm F1.2 R is an interchangeable camera lens announced by Fujifilm on January 6, 2014. As of 2015, it is one of the widest-aperture native mirrorless lenses.

== APD variant ==
In September 2014, Fujifilm announced a variant of this lens, the Fujinon XF 56mm F1.2 R APD, which has an additional APD filter element for apodisation, with the goal of improving the appearance of out-of-focus areas, or bokeh, when the lens is used wide open. This design principle is based on an optical technology originally invented (and patented) by Minolta in the 1980s and implemented in the Minolta/Sony series of Smooth Trans Focus lenses since 1999. As a side effect, light transmission is reduced at the widest apertures, making f/1.2 effectively t/1.7, having progressively less light reduction until f/5.6, beyond which the APD lens has the same light gathering as the standard model without the internal filter. The APD lens also cannot take advantage of phase detection autofocus on cameras with this function, relying instead on slower contrast detection autofocus.

== WR version ==
In 2022, Fujifilm released a weather-resistant (WR) successor to this lens called the XF 56mm F1.2 R WR. The update contains an entirely new optical construction and is larger and heavier at 445 grams.
