= Sony FE 100mm F2.8 STF GM OSS =

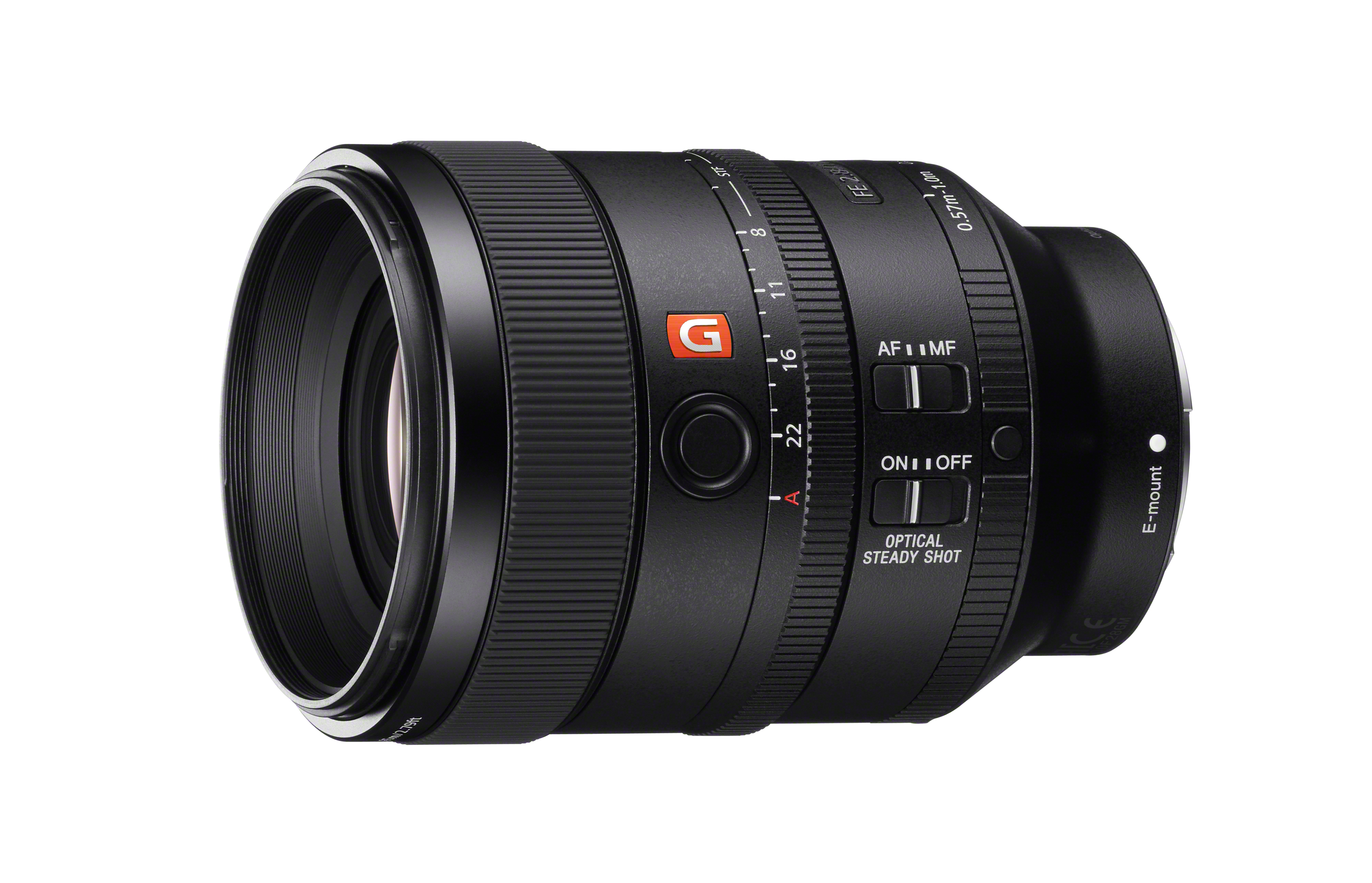
- Maker: Sony
- Lens mount: Sony E-mount

Technical data
- Type: Prime
- Focal length: 100mm
- Image format: 35mm full-frame
- Aperture (max/min): f/2.8 (T5.6) -20 (T22)
- Close focus distance: 0.57 metres (1.9 ft)
- Max. magnification: 1:4 (0.25×)
- Diaphragm blades: 11 blades, circular
- Construction: 13 elements in 10 groups

Features
- Manual focus override: Yes Yes
- Weather-sealing: Yes Yes
- Lens-based stabilization: Yes Yes
- Aperture ring: Yes Yes
- Unique features: GM series, smooth trans focus
- Application: portrait photography

Physical
- Min. length: 118.1 millimetres (4.65 in)
- Max. length: 85.2 millimetres (3.35 in)
- Diameter: 79 millimetres (3.1 in)
- Weight: 700 grams (1.5 lb)
- Filter diameter: 72mm
- Color: black

Accessories
- Lens hood: ALC-SH147

History
- Introduction: 2017

Retail info
- MSRP: $1499 USD (as of 2017)

The Sony FE 100mm F2.8 STF GM OSS is a premium full-frame smooth trans focus prime lens for the Sony E-mount, announced by Sony in 2017.

The lens is currently Sony's only native lens offering Smooth Trans Focus. This compromise in design results in the lens exhibiting the bokeh of an F2.8 lens, while having the light-gathering capabilities of an F5.6 lens, thus requiring good lighting conditions or flash in order to best use the lens.

Given its unusually high 1:4 (0.25×) image reproduction ratio, the 100mm GM lens can be considered a pseudo-macro lens.

Though designed for Sony's full frame E-mount cameras, the lens can be used on Sony's APS-C E-mount camera bodies, with an equivalent full-frame field-of-view of 150mm.

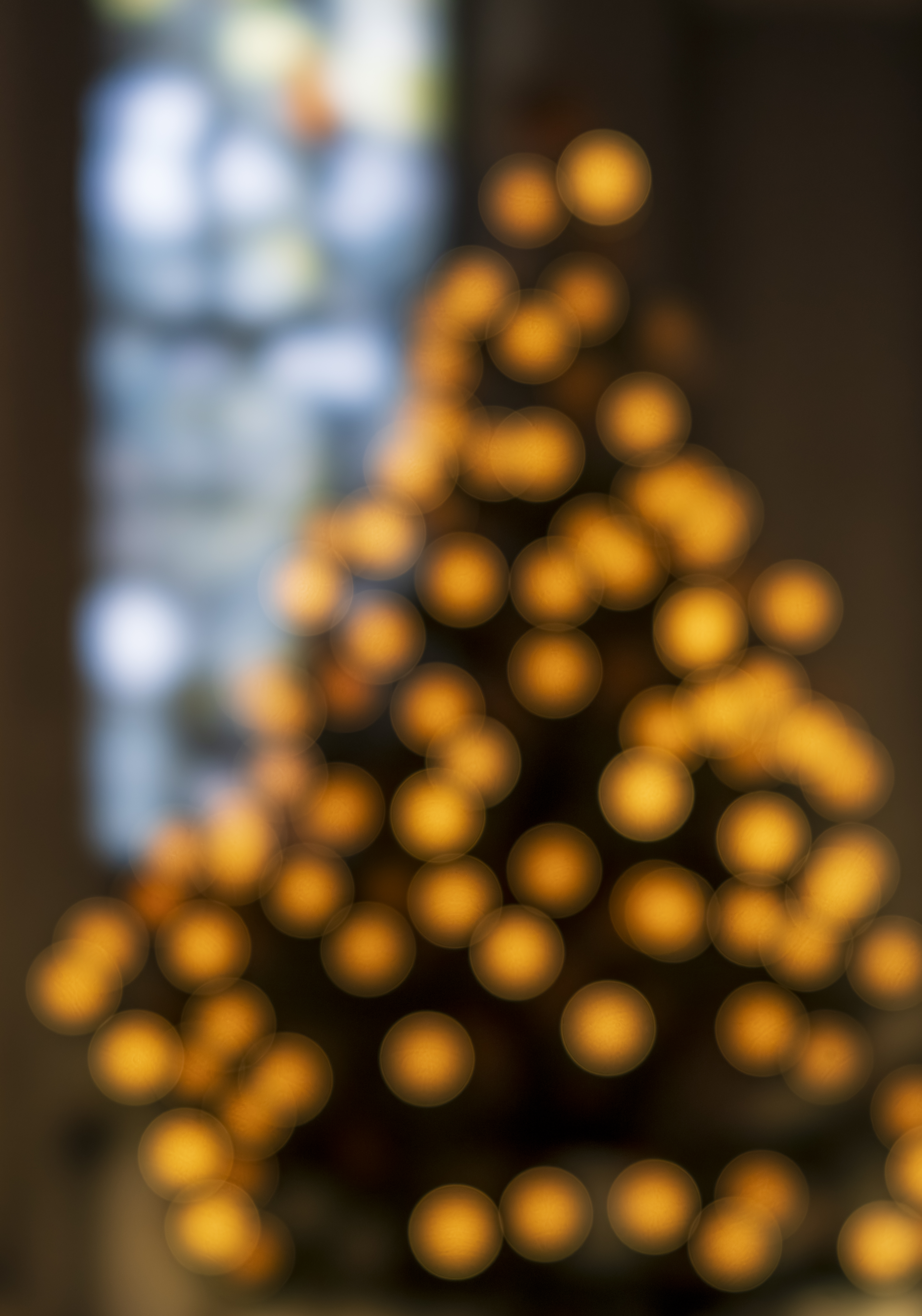
Photo taken with a Sony FE 100mm F2.8 STF GM OSS lens

== See also ==
- List of Sony E-mount lenses
- Venus Optics Laowa 105mm f/2 STF
