= Apodization =

Signal-processing operation

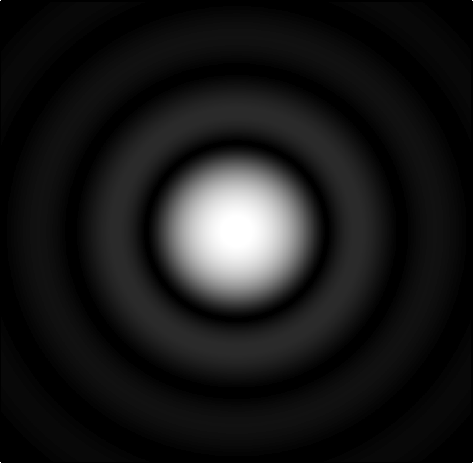
Airy disk

In signal processing, apodization (from Greek "removing the foot") is the modification of the shape of a mathematical function. The function may represent an electrical signal, an optical transmission, or a mechanical structure. In optics, it is primarily used to remove Airy disks caused by diffraction around an intensity peak, improving the focus.

== Apodization in electronics ==
=== Apodization in signal processing ===
The term apodization is used frequently in publications on Fourier-transform infrared (FTIR) signal processing. An example of apodization is the use of the Hann window in fast Fourier transform analyzers to smooth the discontinuities at the beginning and end of the sampled time record.

=== Apodization in digital audio ===
An apodizing filter can be used in digital audio processing instead of the more common brick-wall filters, in order to reduce the pre- and post-ringing that the latter introduces.

=== Apodization in mass spectrometry ===
During oscillation within an Orbitrap, a transient signal may not be stable until the ions settle into their oscillations. Toward the end, subtle ion collisions add up to cause noticeable dephasing. This presents a problem for the Fourier transform, as it averages the oscillatory signal across the length of the time-domain measurement. Software allows "apodization", the removal of the front and back section of the transient signal from consideration in the FT calculation. Thus, apodization improves the resolution of the resulting mass spectrum. Another way to improve the quality of the transient is to wait to collect data until ions have settled into stable oscillatory motion within the trap.

=== Apodization in nuclear magnetic resonance spectroscopy ===
Apodization is applied to NMR signals before discrete Fourier transformation. Typically, NMR signals are truncated due to time constraints (indirect dimension) or to obtain a higher signal-to-noise ratio. In order to reduce truncation artifacts, the signals are subjected to apodization with different types of window functions.

== Apodization in optics ==
Modifying how much a lens transmits as a function of the lateral position, leads to a slightly wider and weaker focus, but at the same time removes the rings around it, thus limiting imaging artifacts.

In optical design jargon, an apodization function is used to purposely change the input intensity profile of an optical system, and it may be a complicated function to tailor the system to certain properties. Usually, it refers to a non-uniform illumination or transmission profile that approaches zero at the edges.

=== Apodization in imaging ===
Since side lobes of the Airy disk are responsible for degrading the image, techniques for suppressing them are used. If the imaging beam has a Gaussian distribution, then when the truncation ratio (the ratio of the diameter of the Gaussian beam to the diameter of the truncating aperture) is set to 1, the side-lobes become negligible and the beam profile becomes purely Gaussian.

In medical ultrasonography, the effect of grating lobes can be reduced by activating ultrasonic transducer elements using variable voltages in the apodization process.

=== Apodization in photography ===
Most camera lenses contain diaphragms which decrease the amount of light coming into the camera. These are not strictly an example of apodization, since the diaphragm does not produce a smooth transition to zero intensity, nor does it shape the intensity profile beyond the "top hat" transmission of its aperture.

Some lenses use other methods to reduce the amount of light let in. For example, the Minolta/Sony STF 135mm f/2.8 T4.5 lens has a special design which accomplishes this by using a concave neutral-gray-tinted lens element as an apodization filter, thereby producing a pleasant bokeh. The same optical effect can be achieved by combining depth-of-field bracketing with multiple exposure, as implemented in the Minolta Maxxum 7's STF function. In 2014, Fujifilm announced a lens utilizing a similar apodization filter in the Fujinon XF 56mm F1.2 R APD lens. In 2017, Sony introduced the E-mount full-frame lens Sony FE 100mm F2.8 STF GM OSS (SEL-100F28GM) based on the same optical Smooth Trans Focus principle.

Simulation of a Gaussian laser beam input profile is also an example of apodization.

Photon sieves provide a relatively easy way to achieve tailored optical apodization.

=== Apodization in astronomy ===
Apodization is used in telescope optics to improve the dynamic range of the image. For example, stars with low intensity in the close vicinity of very bright stars can be made visible using this technique, and even images of planets can be obtained when otherwise obscured by the bright atmosphere of the star they orbit. Generally, apodization reduces the resolution of an optical image; however, because it reduces diffraction edge effects, it can actually enhance certain small details. In fact, the notion of resolution, as it is commonly defined with the Rayleigh criterion, is in this case partially irrelevant. One has to understand that the image formed in the focal plane of a lens (or a mirror) is modeled through the Fresnel diffraction formalism. The classical diffraction pattern, the Airy disk, is connected to a circular pupil, without any obstruction, and with a uniform transmission. Any change in the shape of the pupil (for example a square instead of a circle), or its transmission, results in an alteration to the associated diffraction pattern.

== See also ==
- Apodization function
