= Kyocera Hydro =

Smartphone

- Brand: Kyocera
- Manufacturer: Kyocera Communications, Inc.
- Type: Smartphone
- Series: Hydro
- Compatible networks: CDMA/EVDO (800, 1900 MHz)
- Form factor: Bar
- Dimensions: 115 mm (4.5 in) H 62 mm (2.4 in) W 12.8 mm (0.50 in) D
- Weight: 120 g (4.2 oz)
- Operating system: Android 4.0 Ice Cream Sandwich (Upgrade to Android 4.3 Jellybean)
- CPU: 1 GHz Qualcomm MSM8655 Snapdragon
- GPU: Adreno 205
- Memory: 512 MB RAM
- Storage: 2 GB
- Removable storage: microSD (supports up to 32 GB)
- Front camera: 3.2 Mpx
- Display: IPS LCD, 4.0 in (100 mm) diagonal 320×480 px HVGA
- Data inputs: Multi-touch capacitive touchscreen A-GPS; Accelerometer; Gyroscope; Magnetometer; Proximity sensor

Hydro is a smartphone designed and manufactured by Kyocera. The Hydro features Android 4.0 and 3.5" IPS panel touchscreen. Hydro is one of the first waterproof smartphones, certified for IPX5 & IPX7.

Other specs include Wi-Fi hotspot, and 3.2 MP (2048×1536 px) camera with geotagging.

Media formats supported: Audio: AAC, AAC+, eAAC+, AMR-NB, AMR-WB, MP3, MIDI, Vorbis. Video: MPEG4, H.263, H.264.

== Kyocera Hydro series ==
- Hydro
- Hydro Edge
- Hydro Icon
- Hydro Life
- Hydro wave

== See also ==
- List of Android devices
- Smartphone
