= Cybernet (disambiguation) =

Cybernet is a 1995–2008 British video gaming television programme.

Cybernet may also refer to:

- Cybernet (brand), a defunct German high-fidelity audio equipment manufacturer
- CyberNET Engineering, a fraudulent company founded by Barton H. Watson
- Cybernet Entertainment, parent company of Kink.com and other internet pornography sites
- Cybernet Ventures, developer of the Adult Check online age-verification service

== See also ==
- Cybernetics (disambiguation)
