= Kyocera Honey Bee 201K =

2013 smartphone model

HONEY BEE SoftBank 201K
- Brand: SoftBank
- Manufacturer: Kyocera
- Type: Smartphone
- Series: SoftBank Smartphone
- First released: January 25, 2013; 13 years ago
- Predecessor: 101K
- Compatible networks: SoftBank 3G (W-CDMA, 900 MHz Platinum Band); GSM; SoftBank 4G (AXGP)
- Form factor: Bar
- Colors: White Pink; Pink; Orange; Green; Glossy Purple
- Dimensions: 121 mm (4.8 in) H 57 mm (2.2 in) W 12.9 mm (0.51 in) D
- Weight: 129 g (4.6 oz)
- Operating system: Android 4.1
- System-on-chip: Qualcomm Snapdragon S4 MSM8960
- CPU: 1.5 GHz dual-core
- Memory: 1 GB RAM
- Storage: 4 GB ROM
- Removable storage: microSD (up to 2 GB) microSDHC (up to 32 GB) microSDXC (up to 64 GB)
- Battery: 2000 mAh
- Rear camera: 8.1 MP back-illuminated CMOS
- Front camera: 2.0 MP CMOS
- Display: 3.7 in (94 mm) WVGA (800×480 pixels) TFT, 16.77 million colors
- Water resistance: Waterproof

The HONEY BEE 201K is a 3.9G SoftBank 4G smartphone developed by Kyocera for SoftBank Mobile. Part of the SoftBank Smartphone series, it is the first SoftBank Android smartphone pre-installed with Android 4.1.

== History ==
On October 9, 2012, SoftBank Mobile and Kyocera officially announced the HONEY BEE 201K. The device passed FCC certification on December 14, 2012. Sales of the device officially began on January 25, 2013.

== Specifications ==
=== Hardware ===
The HONEY BEE 201K features a 3.7-inch WVGA TFT display with a resolution of 800×480 pixels supporting up to 16.77 million colors. It measures 121 mm in height, 57 mm in width, and 12.9 mm in thickness, with a total weight of approximately 129 grams. A key design feature is a large strap hole located at the top right of the device, designed to easily attach charms and accessories.

The phone is powered by a 1.5 GHz dual-core Qualcomm Snapdragon S4 MSM8960 system-on-chip, paired with 1 GB of RAM and 4 GB of internal storage, expandable via microSD cards up to 2 GB, microSDHC cards up to 32 GB, and microSDXC cards up to 64 GB. It contains a 2000 mAh battery offering up to 950 minutes of 3G talk time and up to 390 hours of AXGP standby time.

For photography, the device is equipped with an 8.1-megapixel back-illuminated CMOS main camera and a 2.0-megapixel CMOS front camera. Additional hardware features include 1Seg TV tuner support, Osaifu-Keitai (FeliCa), infrared communication, Bluetooth 4.0, Wi-Fi (IEEE 802.11a/b/g/n), GPS, and IPX5/IPX7 water resistance.

=== Software ===
The device runs on the Android 4.1 operating system. Standard software feature support includes Japanese text input via iWnn, mobile tethering capabilities, Emergency Alert Mail support, and media playback support for AAC and WMA audio formats.
