= Kyocera Urbano Progresso =

Kyocera mobile phone

URBANO PROGRESSO
- Brand: au
- Manufacturer: Kyocera
- Series: URBANO series
- First released: May 30, 2012
- Compatible networks: 3G: CDMA2000 1xMC (800 MHz / 2 GHz); 2G: GSM (900 / 1800 / 1900 MHz)
- Colors: Black; Silver; Orange; Pink
- Dimensions: 125 mm (4.9 in) H 64 mm (2.5 in) W 10.8 mm (0.43 in) D
- Weight: 139 g (4.9 oz)
- Operating system: Android 4.0.3
- System-on-chip: Qualcomm Snapdragon S2 MSM8655T
- CPU: 1.4 GHz
- Memory: 1 GB RAM
- Storage: 4 GB ROM (2 GB user accessible)
- Removable storage: microSD (up to 2 GB), microSDHC (up to 32 GB)
- Battery: 1,500 mAh
- Rear camera: 8.08 MP CMOS, autofocus, image stabilization
- Front camera: 0.32 MP CMOS
- Display: 3.97 in (101 mm) PenTile OLED, 480×800 pixels
- Model: KYY04

The URBANO PROGRESSO (model number: KYY04) is an Android slate-style smartphone manufactured by Kyocera for the URBANO series line on Japanese telecommunications carriers au (KDDI) and Okinawa Cellular Telephone Company. It supports CDMA 1X WIN and +WiMAX connectivity. As the first domestic Japanese smartphone for au to feature Android 4.0, it was developed based on the existing DIGNO ISW11K and officially carries the DIGNO brand logo. Instead of a traditional earpiece speaker ("speaker-less"), the device uses Smart Sonic Receiver technology, which utilizes a ceramic piezoelectric transducer to vibrate the display glass and transmit sound directly through tissue and bone. This marked the world's first implementation of tissue-conduction tissue/vibration sound technology on a smartphone, allowing clarity even in noisy conditions or through headphones. The phone features a 3.97-inch OLED display protected by Corning Gorilla Glass, a 1,500 mAh battery, a 2 GB microSD card in the box, and support for microSIM cards (au IC Card). Features localized for Japan include 1seg TV tuning, Osaifu-Keitai e-wallet support, and IrDA infrared connectivity.

== History ==
The URBANO PROGRESSO was officially announced by KDDI and Kyocera on May 15, 2012. It received certification from the Federal Communications Commission (FCC) on May 29, 2012. The device was officially released across Japan on May 30, 2012.

== Specifications ==
The URBANO PROGRESSO features a 3.97-inch PenTile OLED screen with a resolution of 480×800 pixels, powered by a single-core 1.4 GHz Qualcomm Snapdragon S2 MSM8655T processor with 1 GB of RAM and 4 GB of internal storage (expandable up to 32 GB via microSDHC). Photos are handled by an 8.08 MP primary CMOS camera with autofocus and image stabilization, alongside a 0.32 MP secondary front camera. The body measures 125 mm by 64 mm by 10.8 mm (with a maximum thickness of 11.3 mm) and weighs approximately 139 g. Connective capabilities include 3G CDMA2000, 2G GSM, dual-band Wi-Fi (IEEE 802.11a/b/g/n), Mobile WiMAX (IEEE 802.16e-2005), Bluetooth 2.1+EDR, and IrDA infrared.

Software features shipped out-of-the-box on Android 4.0.3, integrated with Japanese text input via iWnn for Android. Built-in software features include Skype for Android, Friends Note, Foursquare, Kisekae Touch, Sugumoji for Android, Twitter, Jibun Bank, and a selection of au services including LISMO for Android, LISMO WAVE, au Smart Sports, au one Naviwalk, and Emergency Earthquake Alerts.

== Known issues ==
- A software bug causing home screen layout and text corruption when rapidly switching screens or tapping while launching applications was fixed in a software update on June 27, 2012.
- Dropped calls in areas with poor reception (such as indoors or in the shadow of buildings) and display errors when receiving disaster or evacuation alerts were resolved in an update on August 21, 2012.
- An issue affecting the step counting accuracy of the Daily Step function during transit transfers was fixed in an update on October 25, 2012.
- A security vulnerability allowing arbitrary Java method execution was patched in a software update on December 26, 2013.
