= S750 =

S750 may refer to:

- Canon S750, a Canon S Series digital camera
- Sanyo S750 and S750i, two Sanyo mobile phones marketed in the United Kingdom
- DSC-S750, a Sony Cyber-shot camera model
- Lenovo S750 camera-mobile phone
