= Kagoshima Nanatsujima Mega Solar Power Plant =

Power plant in Kagoshima, Japan

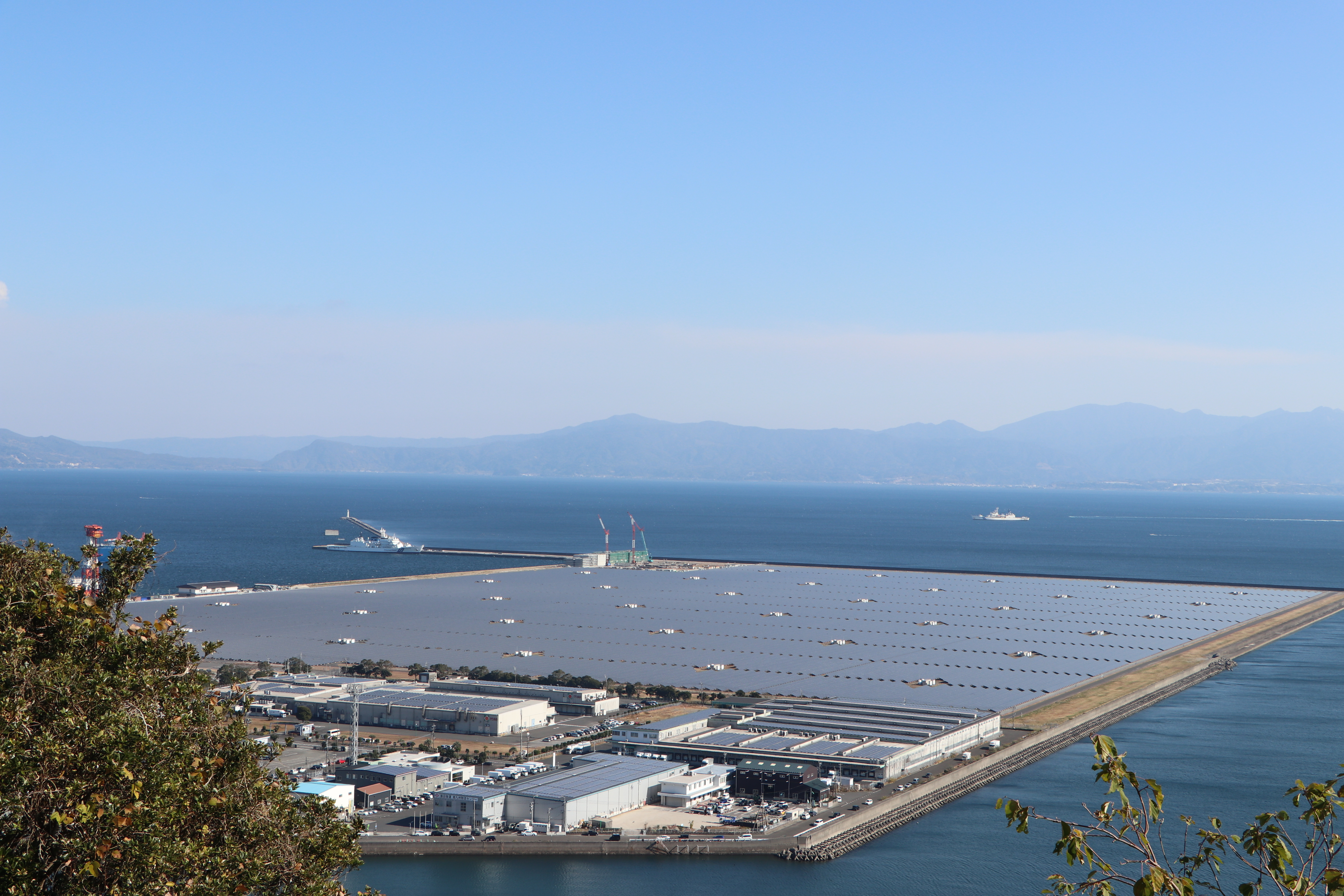
- A distant view of the plant
- Country: Japan
- Location: 2 Nanatsujima; Kagoshima City; Kagoshima Prefecture; Japan
- Coordinates: 31.4666°N 130.5254°E
- Status: Operational
- Construction began: November 2012
- Commission date: November 2013
- Owner: Kagoshima Mega Solar Power Corporation

Solar farm
- Collectors: 290,000
- Site area: 127 hectares

Power generation
- Nameplate capacity: 70 MW

External links
- Commons: Related media on Commons

The Kagoshima Nanatsujima Mega Solar Power Plant (鹿児島七ツ島メガソーラー発電所) is a solar power generating station located in Kagoshima, Japan. It sits on a platform of reclaimed land on the coast of Kagoshima Bay. With a capacity of 70 MW, it was formerly the largest solar plant in Japan.

== History ==
The site at Nanatsujima formerly consisted of seven islands, but decades ago a large, flat platform was reclaimed from the sea for industrial use. The site was purchased by IHI Corporation for use as a shipyard, a plan that was never realised. The site lay idle for many years.

Construction of the solar plant began in September 2012. Construction and engineering was carried out by Kyocera Solar Corporation, Kyudenko Corporation, and Takenaka Corporation. The plant went online on 1 November 2013. At the time of commissioning, it was the largest solar plant in Japan, and the first in the country with a capacity over 50 MW. It has since been surpassed in scale by several other solar plants.

== Facility and operations ==
The power station occupies an area of approximately 127 hectares (310 acres). It has a capacity of 70 MW, generated by 290,000 solar panels. The station also has a public tour facility called the Kagoshima Nanatsujima Solar Science Museum.

Operation and maintenance of the plant is carried out by Kyocera and Kyudenko. The power generated is sold to Kyushu Electric Power under the Japanese government's feed-in tariff programme.

The impact of volcanic ash, from nearby Sakurajima, on the plant's generating capacity has been a point of concern. Five lorries with high-pressure cleaning equipment are kept at the power station so that volcanic ash can be washed off the solar panels. However, the cleaning equipment had not been used in the first three years of operation as the accumulated ash washed off the panels naturally.

== Ownership ==
The plant was developed by Kagoshima Mega Solar Power Corporation, a consortium of seven companies, namely: Kyocera Corporation, KDDI Corporation, IHI Corporation, Kyudenko Corporation, Kagoshima Bank, Bank of Kyoto, and Takenaka Corporation. The land upon which the plant sits is owned by IHI Corporation and leased to the consortium.

== See also ==
- List of power stations in Japan
- Solar power in Japan
