= Kyocera Zio =

Smartphone model

Kyocera Zio / SANYO Zio
- Manufacturers: Kyocera Communications, Inc.
- Type: Slate smartphone
- First released: United States March 23, 2010; 16 years ago (Cricket)
- Dimensions: 116 mm (4.6 in) H 58.6 mm (2.31 in) W 12.2 mm (0.48 in) D
- Weight: 105 g (3.7 oz)
- Operating system: Android 1.6 at release, 2.2 on Cricket, 2.2 on Sprint, Sprint ID
- CPU: 600 MHz Qualcomm MSM7227 CPU ARM11 processor
- Memory: 256 MB
- Storage: Flash memory: 512 MB microSD slot: supports up to 32 GB
- Battery: 3.7 V 1130 mAh; Internal rechargeable removable lithium-ion battery
- Rear camera: 3.2 megapixel with auto focus and 30 fps video
- Display: 800 × 480 px, 3.5 in (89 mm), WVGA, 262,140 color LCD
- Connectivity: Wi-Fi (802.11b/g), Bluetooth 2.0+EDR, MicroUSB, A-GPS; 1x EV-DO Rev.A
- Data inputs: Multi-touch capacitive touchscreen display, volume controls, 3-axis accelerometer

The Kyocera Zio (also known as SANYO Zio, also stylized ZIO, model numbers SCP-8600/M6000) is an Internet-enabled 3G smartphone manufactured by Kyocera, running Google's Android operating system.

It was announced on March 23, 2010, and is expected to sell for a retail price of $169 and $216, with no carrier subsidies. As such, it will be one of the lowest cost smartphones running the Android operating system.

Leap Wireless, a low-cost and prepaid CDMA-based wireless carrier in the US, announced on March 23, 2010 that it would introduce the Zio smartphone, in late summer 2010. This would be the first Android smartphone offered by Leap Wireless or its Cricket Wireless subsidiary.

Kyocera has stated that the phone is easily upgraded to Android version 2.0 or 2.1, based on carrier wishes. Cricket Wireless released an update for the phone to Android 2.2 on February 28, 2011.

The SANYO Zio became available to Sprint customers on October 10, 2010 with Android 2.1 (Eclair) and is one of the first to use Sprint's exclusive Sprint ID user interface.
