= Yashica =

Japanese camera manufacturer

- Yashica Electro 35 GSN
- Native name: 株式会社ヤシカ
- Romanized name: Kabushiki-gaisha Yashika
- Type: Kabushiki gaisha
- Traded as: TYO: 7755 (1961–1983)
- Industry: Photography, Rangefinder camera, SLR cameras, Digital Imaging
- Founded: December 1949; Nagano, Japan
- Headquarters: Nagano, Japan
- Area served: Worldwide
- Products: Cameras, photographic lenses, and other optical equipment
- Website: www.yashica.com

Yashica Co., Ltd. (株式会社ヤシカ, Kabushiki-gaisha Yashica) is a Japanese manufacturer of cameras, lenses, and photography equipment, founded in 1949, in Nagano, Japan. The company ceased operations in 2008 and returned to the industry in 2015.

In recent years, Yashica has sought to build on its historical legacy by developing new products that blend analog aesthetics with modern digital technology. These include digital cameras featuring film simulation modes designed to recreate the look of classic film photography, as well as night vision goggles positioned at accessible price points. Alongside its core imaging products, Yashica has also collaborated with various brands and companies, such as Miu Miu, Diesel, Sanrio, and Peanuts, on limited-edition releases and design partnerships.

While the company’s focus has evolved over time, Yashica continues to draw from its Japanese origins and longstanding association with accessible, thoughtfully designed imaging tools.

== History ==
The company began in December 1949 in Nagano, Japan, when the Yashima Seiki Company was founded with an initial investment of $566. Its eight employees originally manufactured components for electric clocks. Later, they began making camera components, and by June 1953 had introduced their first complete camera, the Yashimaflex, a twin lens reflex (TLR) camera designed for 6x6 cm medium format film. While the Yashimaflex used lenses labeled Tri-Lausar, successive models used Yashikor and Yashinon lenses. All of these lenses were manufactured for Yashica by the Tomioka Optical Works, beginning a relationship that lasted for many years. Late in 1953, Yashima Seiki Company became Yashima Optical Industry Company, Ltd.

In 1957, Yashima founded Yashica, Inc., a subsidiary arm in New York City to manage marketing efforts in the United States. 1957 also marked the introduction of a popular new TLR camera series, the Yashica Mat line, as well as an 8mm cine movie camera. Yashima continued to grow, with 1,982 employees by 1958 when it changed its name to Yashica Company, Ltd, on acquiring the Nicca Camera Company, Ltd. The Nicca acquisition was fortunate, as the designs acquired assisted Yashica in expanding its product line into advanced 35 mm rangefinder cameras.

The Yashica Pentamatic, an advanced, modern 35 mm single lens reflex (SLR) camera with a proprietary bayonet-mount, automatic diaphragm (offered only with the Auto Yashinon 50mm/1.8 lens), and interchangeable lenses, was introduced in 1959. As before, Yashica continued to source its lenses from the Tomioka Optical factory.

Around 1959–1960, Yashica acquired the assets of the bankrupt Zunow Optical Industry Co. Ltd. Though a small company, Zunow had become known for limited production of a very advanced 35 mm SLR camera, along with several high-quality, fast 35 mm camera and 8mm cine (movie) lens designs and a proprietary bayonet-mount lens system similar to that of Yashica Pentamatic. With the assistance of Tomioka Optical Works, Yashica adapted Zunow lens designs into its own 8mm turret cine (movie) cameras.

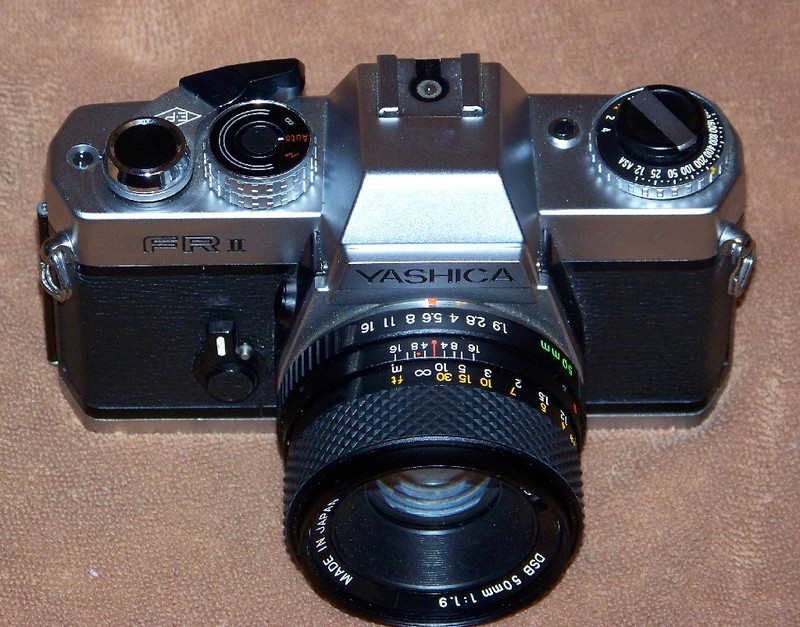
Top of FRII

Like Zunow, Yashica found it difficult to gain market acceptance with its proprietary SLR lens mount, and redesigned its SLR camera line in 1962 to accept the Contax/Praktica M42 lens mount. The new SLR camera was introduced as the Penta J.

In December 1965, Yashica introduced the world's first commercially successful electronically controlled 35 mm camera, the Yashica Electro 35, a popular rangefinder camera that in various model subvariants eventually sold 8 million units. The company continued to expand its international markets, and in August 1968, Yashica acquired its lens manufacturer, the Tomioka Optical and Machine Manufacturing Co., Ltd. (later renamed the Tomioka Optical Co. Ltd.). By this time, Tomioka was one of the largest and most reputable lens manufacturers in Japan. Sales of 35 mm SLRs continued to grow steadily, and Yashica was quickly acquiring a reputation for both electronic camera expertise and high-quality optics. 1968 also marked the year of Yashica's last major TLR camera design, the Yashica Mat-124, a popular model which combined some of the best features of Yashica's earlier TLR cameras.

In 1968 Yashica introduced the TL Electro-X 35 mm SLR camera and produced it until 1974. It had the M42 screw thread lens mount for its interchangeable lenses. It also had an all-electronic through-the-lens exposure meter in the viewfinder using lighted arrows (not true LEDs, which were first introduced with the Fujica ST801). The Copal Square SE shutter, a vertically travelling metal blade focal plane shutter made by Copal Corporation, used in the camera, was electronically controlled.

In 1970, Yashica introduced their final TLR camera, the Yashica Mat-124G, perhaps the most evolved of the TLR variants. Like several of the earlier versions it featured a built in light meter. Settings to the shutter speed and aperture had to be made manually but it allowed the camera to be used without an additional handheld meter. The 124G allowed conversion from 120 roll film to 220 roll film. Another improvement was the film advance lever, which now controlled both shutter and film advance.

In 1972, Yashica introduced the TL Electro 35 mm SLR camera which was similar to the Pentax Spotmatic camera made by the Asahi Optical Company (Pentax). The TL Electro also used a lighted exposure meter display similar to that in the TL Electro-X, as well as the M42 screw threaded lens mount for its interchangeable lenses.

=== Collaboration with Carl Zeiss and Contax ===
In 1973, Yashica began Top Secret Project 130, a collaboration with Carl Zeiss that produced the RTS (for "real time system"), a new, professional 35 mm SLR with an electronically controlled shutter bearing the Contax brand. A new prestige line of Yashica/Contax lenses designed by Carl Zeiss was introduced for the camera, with a common C/Y bayonet mount allowing lens interchange between all 35 mm Contax and Yashica SLR camera models. The F. Alexander Porsche Group was hired to complete an ergonomic and styling study of the new camera. The new Contax RTS appeared at photokina in 1974, and became a commercial success. Yashica soon introduced several new 35 mm SLR cameras beginning with the FX-1 (1975) and FX-2 (1976). Also in that year, in response to the success of the Contax RTS, Yashica developed the upscale Yashica FR using some of the features of the RTS, including its electromagnetic shutter release. The FR was capable of using the entire range of Carl Zeiss T* lenses. In contemporaneous tests, the FR was described as being tougher in some ways than the more expensive Contax RTS, including better sealing against dust and contaminants. This practice of "pairing" similar Contax models with more affordable, less full-featured, but still high-quality Yashica models would continue for the next ten years. The FR was quickly followed in April 1977 by the FR-I and FR-II. The FR-I was a 35 mm SLR offering even more features of the RTS, including an electronic shutter with both manual and aperture priority modes, and marked the high point for the Yashica brand in competing with Nikon, Canon, and Minolta for the semi-professional SLR camera market.

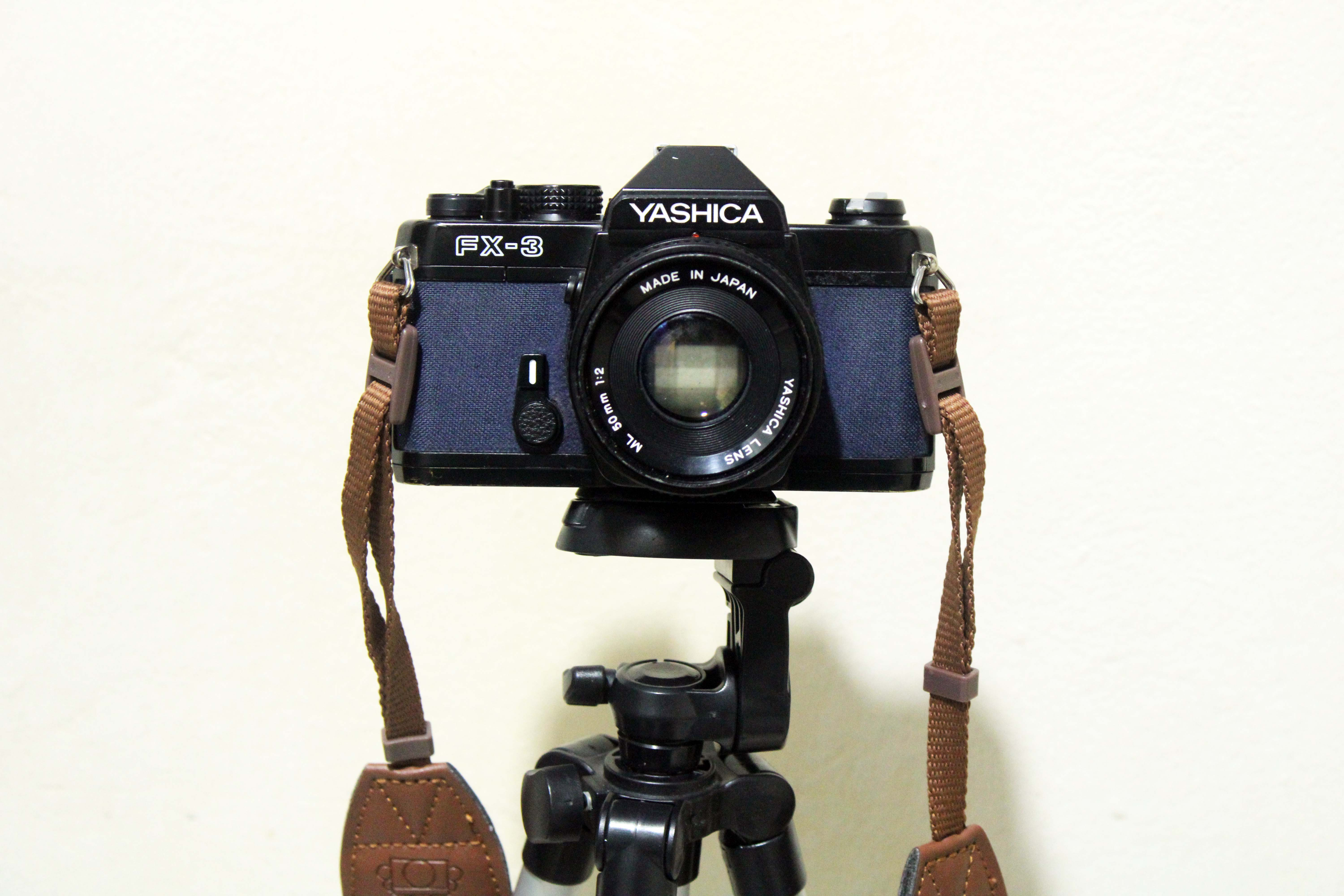
A blue edition of the Yashica FX-3

In 1979, Yashica introduced a new inexpensive 35 mm consumer SLR, the FX-3, intended for entry-level buyers. Designed and manufactured to Yashica specifications by Cosina, the affordable FX-3 still incorporated the C/Y lens mount that would also accept Carl Zeiss T* lenses. This simple, lightweight manual-exposure SLR camera sold well, and with minor revisions, stayed in production until 2002.

=== Kyocera era ===
In October 1983, Yashica Company Ltd. was acquired by ceramics giant Kyocera (Kyoto Ceramics). Initially, the merger resulted in few outward changes. The manual-focus (MF) FX-103 Program, introduced in 1985, continued the "pairing" tradition of high-end Yashica SLR models with Contax (Contax 159 mm), and was the first Yashica SLR with through the lens (TTL) flash and full programmed exposure capabilities.

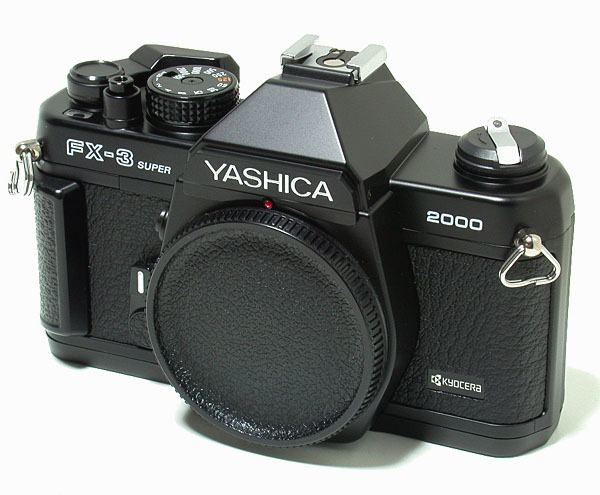
A black Yashica FX-3 Super 2000

After 1983, all Yashica brand cameras were marketed by Kyocera, which also made newer Contax cameras. By 1985, the company was facing intense market competition from other manufacturers, especially Minolta, which had introduced a competitively priced and advanced autofocus 35 mm SLR camera. Yashica eventually introduced its own autofocus 35 mm SLR camera line that was overpriced and poorly marketed in comparison to its competition. In response, Kyocera gradually repositioned the brand as a budget-priced point-and-shoot camera line, moving production from Japan to Hong Kong, and discontinued high-end SLR camera production.

In 2005, Kyocera halted production on all Contax, Yashica, and other Kyocera-branded film and digital cameras.

=== The new Yashica era ===
In 2008, Kyocera sold the trademark rights of Yashica Inc. to Hong Kong-based MF Jebsen Group, and is under its subsidiary JNC Datum Tech International, Limited. In late 2017, Yashica announced a digital camera, the Y35 DigiFilm camera, which raised $1.28 million on Kickstarter. The Y35, styled to resemble the old Yashica Electro 35 film camera, incorporated 'digifilm' – interchangeable faux 35 film canisters that set a precise combination of ISO and size aspect ratios.

== Camera models 1949–2005 ==
=== TLRs ===
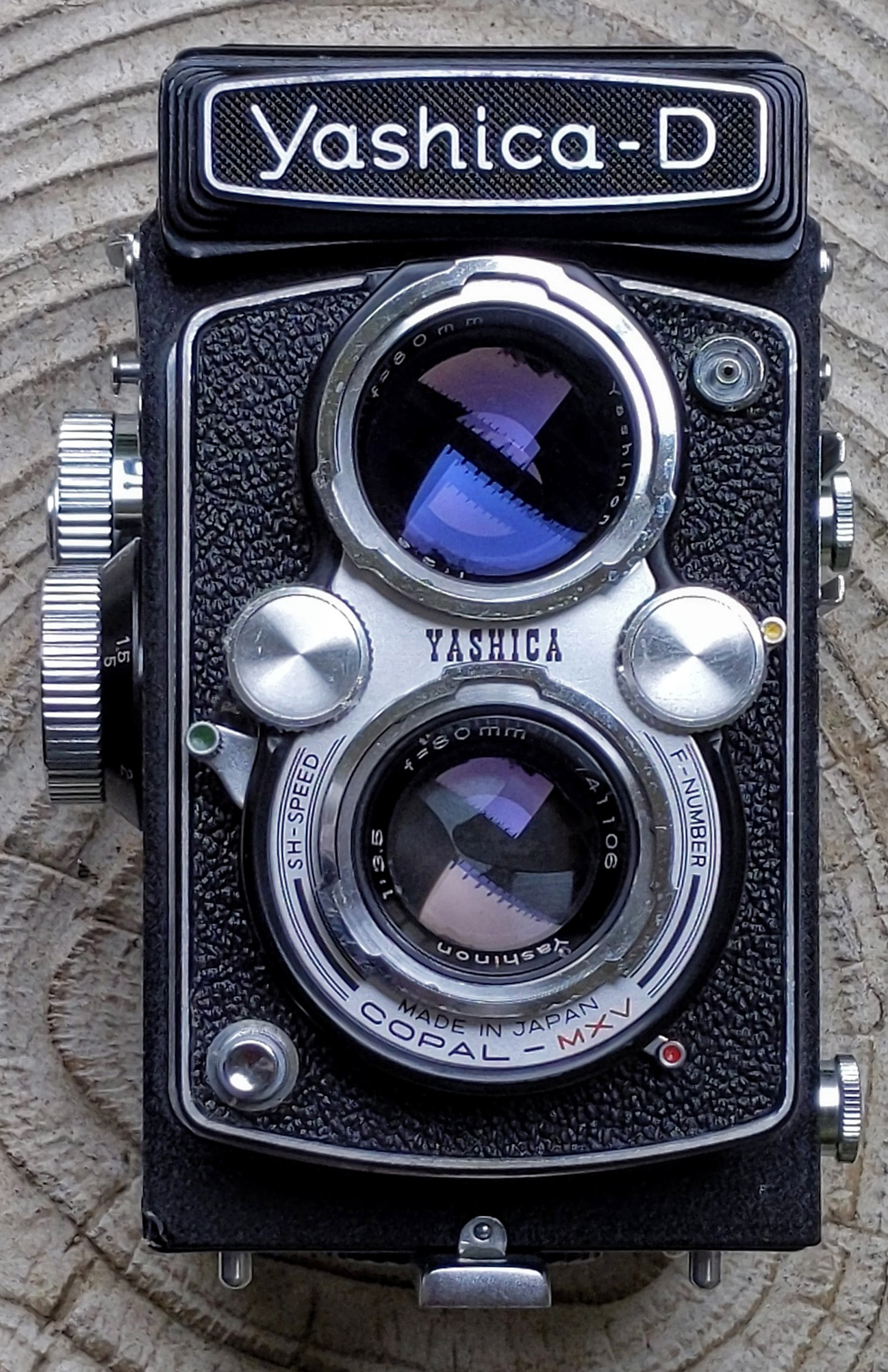
Yashica-D with later f/2.8 viewing lens

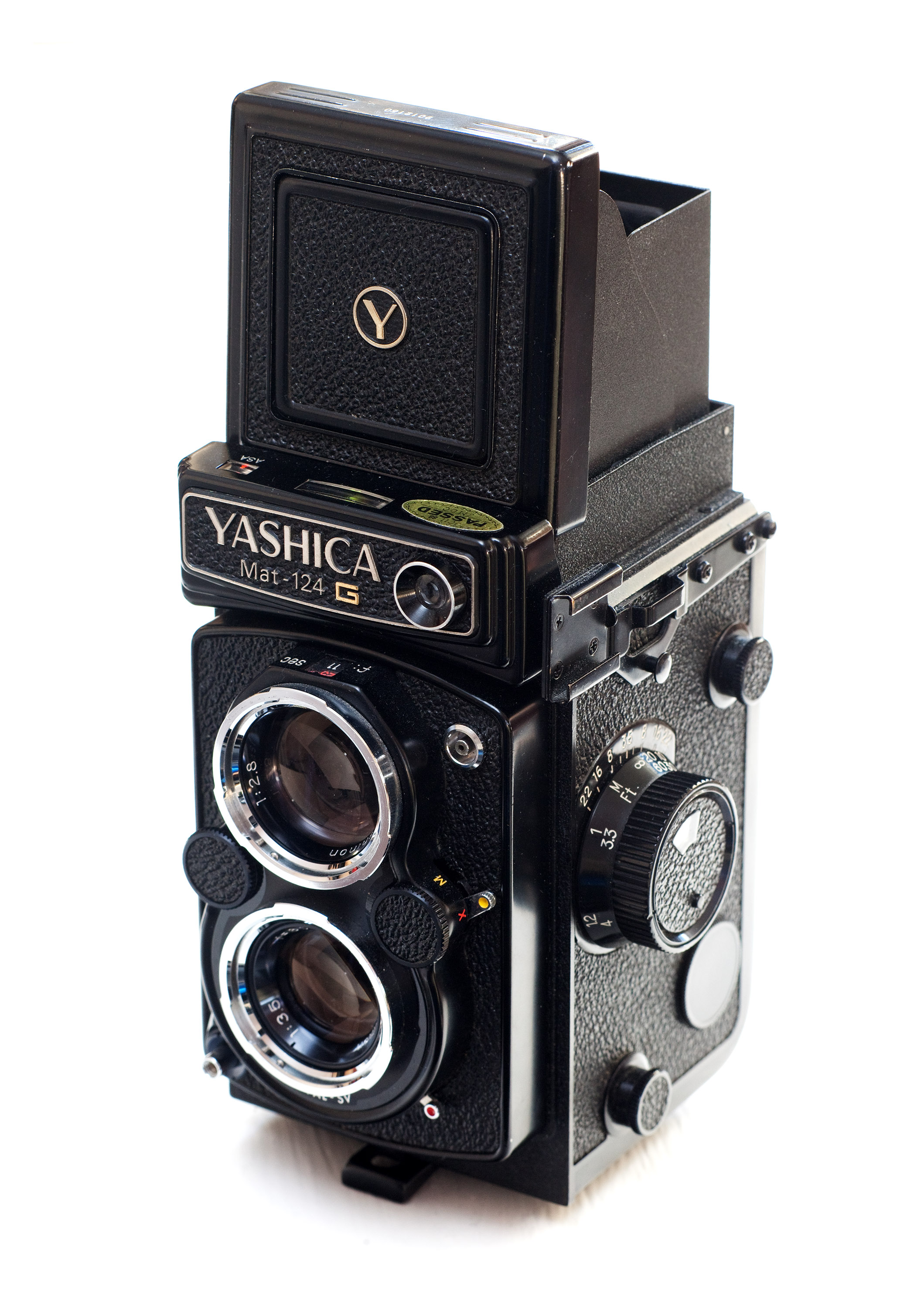
Yashica Mat 124G

- Pigeonflex (1953)
- Yashimaflex (1953)
- YashicaFlex (1953)
- MolfoReflex (1953)
- Yashicaflex A, AS I & II (1954)
- Yashica C (1955)
- Yashicaflex Rookie (1956)
- Yashica B (1957)
- Yashica LM (1957)
- Yashica-Mat (1957)
- Yashica A (1958), D (1958)
- Yashica 44 (1958)
- Yashica-D (1958)
- Yashica 635 (1958)
- Yashica Auto (1959)
- Yashica Mat LM (1959)
- Yashica 44LM (1959)
- Yashica 44A (1960)
- Yashica Mat EM (1964)
- Yashica E (1964)
- Yashica 24 (1965)
- Yashica 12 (1967)
- Yashica-Mat 124 (1968)
- Yashica-Mat 124 G (1970)
- Yashica-Mat 124 B (1975) (Brazil-only export variant of 124G, no exposure meter)

=== 35 mm rangefinder ===
- Electro 35
- Electro 35 FC
- Electro 35 CC
- Electro 35 MC
- Electro 35 CCN
- Electro 35 GL
- Electro 35 GS
- Electro 35 GSN
- Electro 35 GT
- Electro 35 GTN
- Electro 35 GX
- Yashica 35
- Yashica 35-f
- Yashica Minister II
- Yashica Minister III
- Yashica 35J
- Yashica EE
- Yashica Lynx
- Yashica MG-1
- Yashica Minimatic C
- Yashica Minimatic S
- Yashica Minimatic EL
- Yashica Minister 700
- Yashica Minister D
- Yashica Campus

=== 35 mm SLR cameras ===
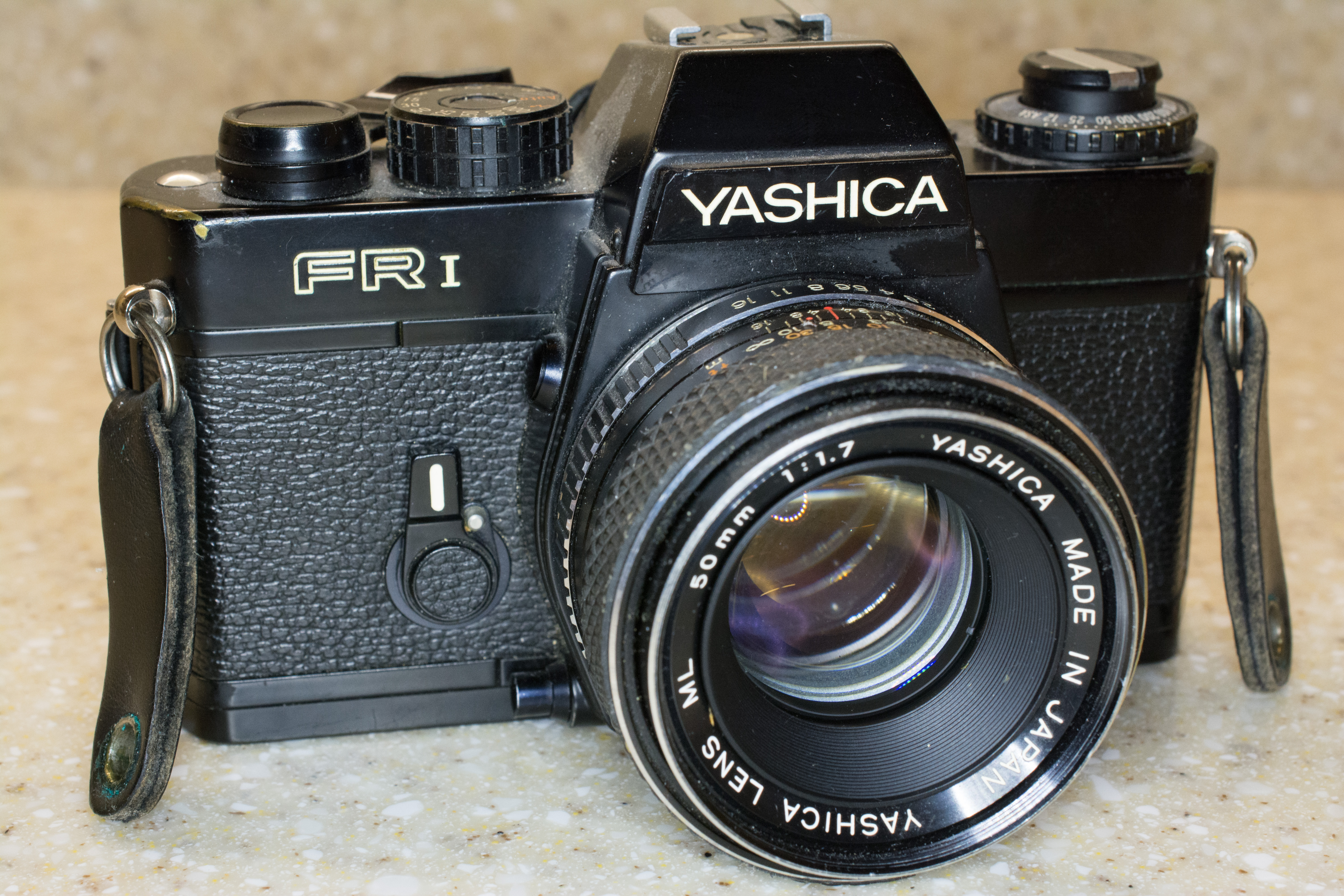
Yashica FR-I SLR with a ML 50 mm f/1.7 lens

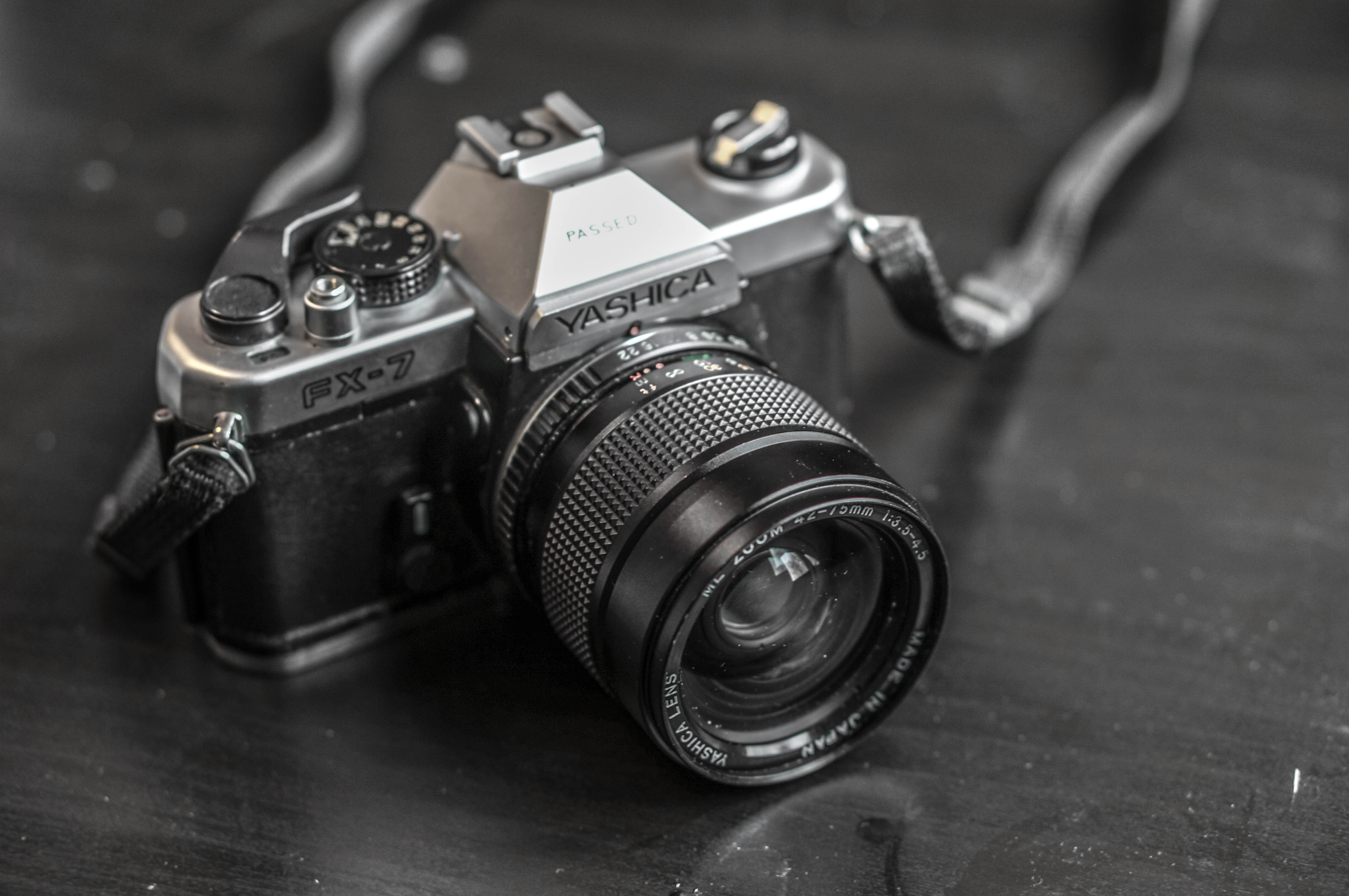
Yashica FX-7 (1979–1984)

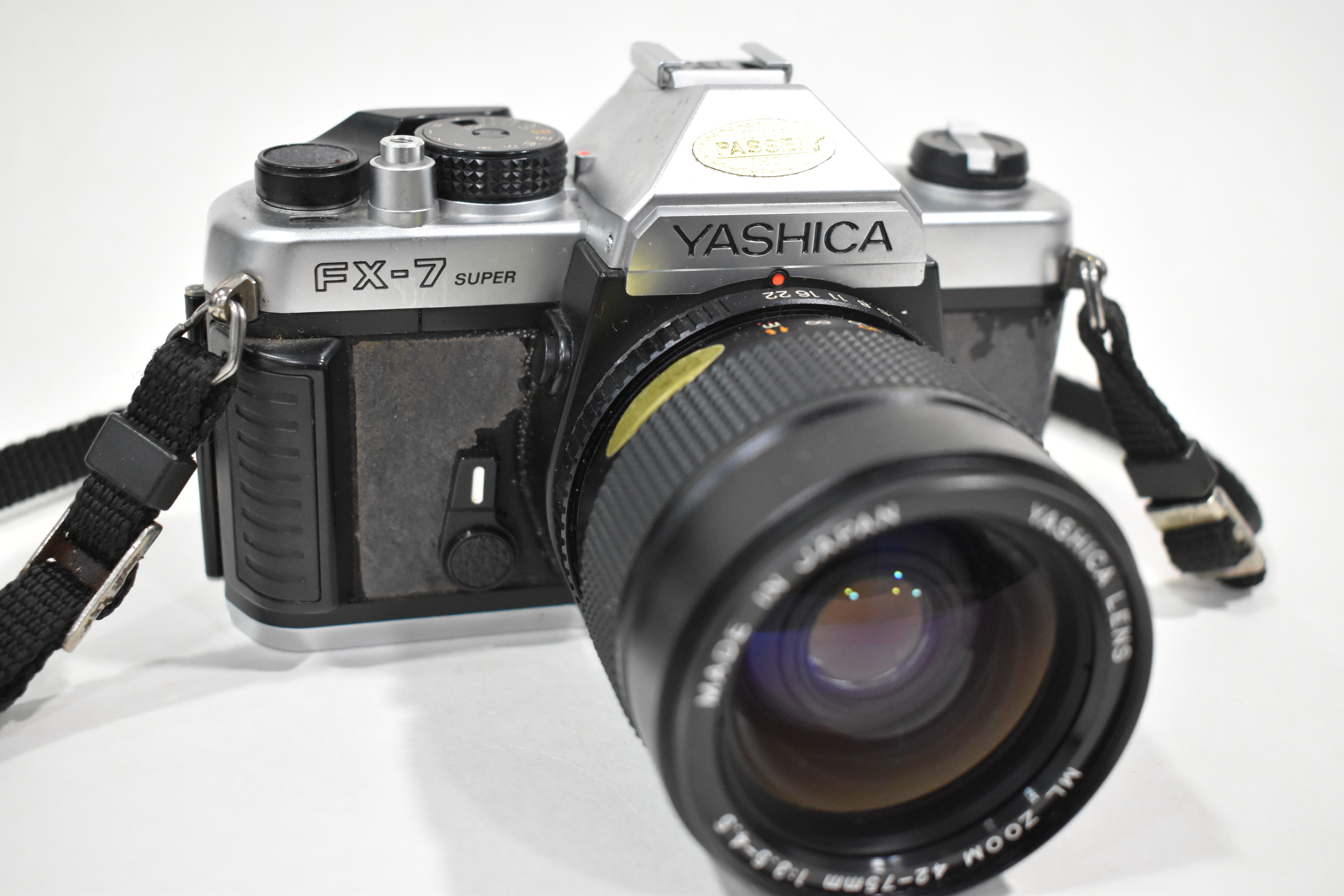
YASHICA FX-7 SUPER

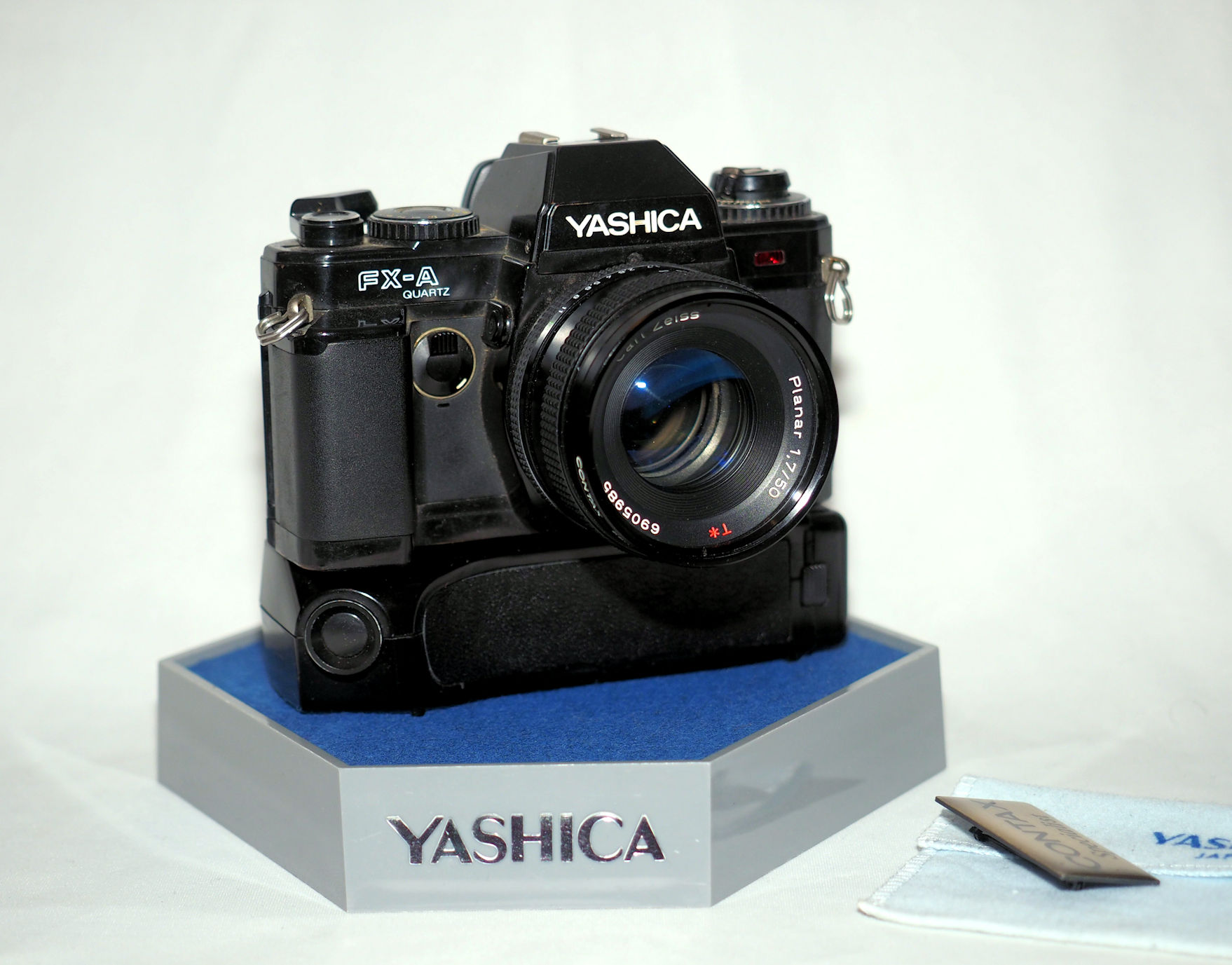
Rarest of Yashica 35mm SLRs

==== Fixed lens ====
- Dental Eye I
- Dental Eye II
- Dental Eye III/Medical Eye (Only Japan)

==== Yashica proprietary bayonet mount ====
- Yashica Pentamatic
- Yashica J-3
- Yashica TL Electro-X
- Yashica 300 AF
- Yashica Pentamatic
- Yashica Pentamatic II
- Yashica Pentamatic S

==== M42 screw thread mount ====
- Yashica Penta J
- Yashica J-3
- Yashica J-4
- Yashica J-5
- Yashica J-P
- Yashica J-7
- Yashica Electro-AX
- Yashica TL
- Yashica TL-E
- Yashica TL Electro
- Yashica TL Electro-X
- Yashica TL Electro-X ITS
- Yashica TL Super
- Yashica FFT

==== Contax/Yashica (C/Y) bayonet mount ====
- FR
- FR-I
- FR-II
- FX-1
- FX-2
- FX-3
- FX-3 Super
- FX-3 Super 2000
- FX-7
- FX-7 Super Yashica FX-7 Super
- FX-8 (Only China)
- FX-70
- FX-80 (Only China)
- FX-103
- FX-800 Super (Only China)
- FX-A (less than 1400 pieces Only US & Europe)
- FX-D
- FX-D SE
- 107MP/TR-7000/Revue AC-7/DAEWOO 107MP
- 108MP/Revue AC-8/YODOBASHI CAMERA (Japan Only)
- 109MP

==== Autofocus SLR (Kyocera/Yashica mount) ====
- 200AF
- 210AF (Kyocera Brand Only)
- 230AF
- 270AF/230 Super
- 300AF

=== Compact 35 mm ===
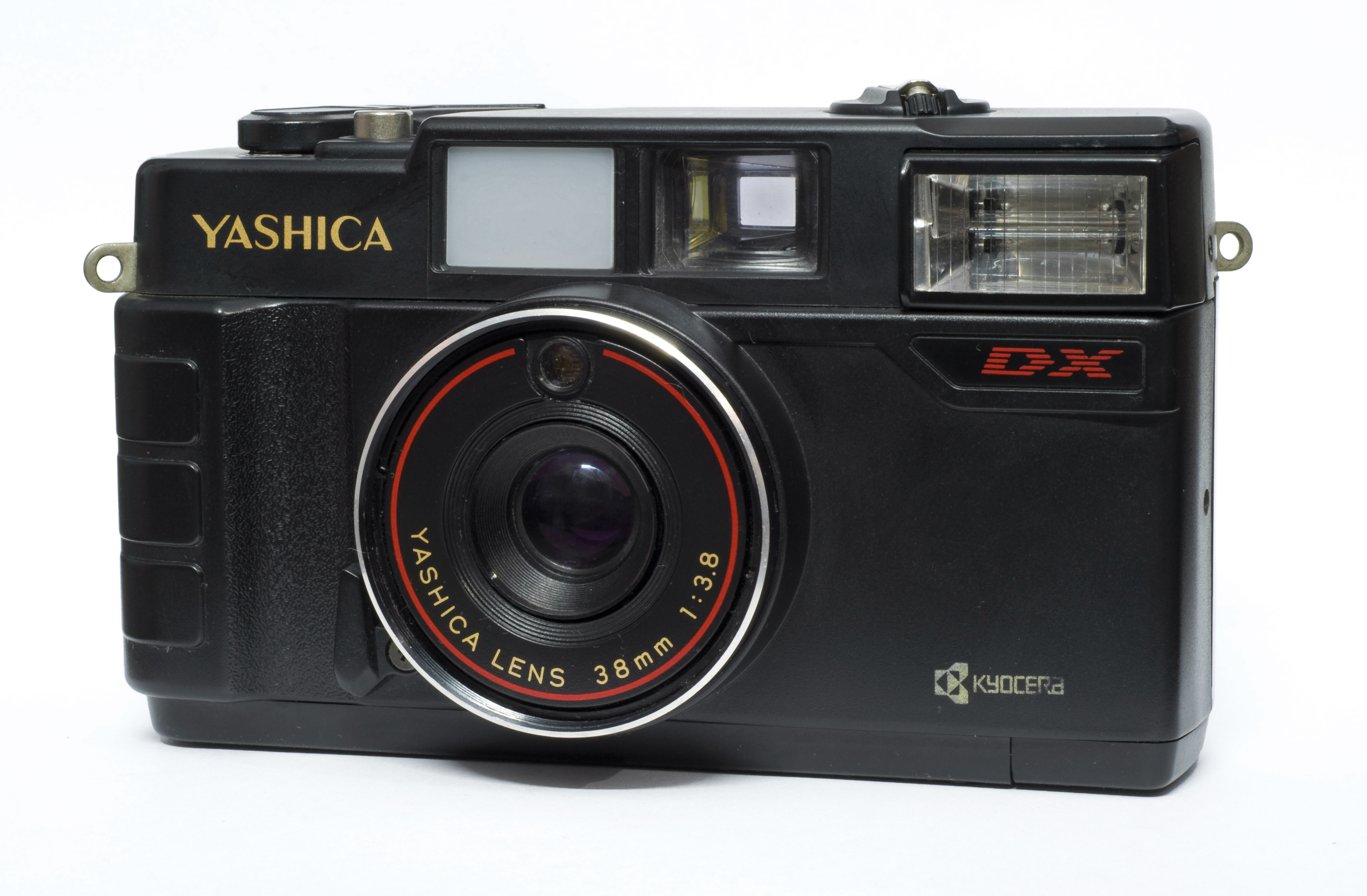
Yashica MF-2 super

- Yashica AF-J
- Yashica AF-J 2
- Yashica AF-J 3
- Yashica auto focus
- Yashica auto focus motor
- Yashica auto focus motor D
- Yashica Auto Focus Motor II
- Yashica LAF
- Yashica Lynx
- Yashica MF-2
- Yashica MF-2 super
- Yashica MF-3
- Yashica MF-3 super
- Yashica 35-ME
- Yashica ME-1
- Yashica 35-MF
- Yashica 35-MC
- Yashica MG-2 AutoFlash
- Yashica Motor J
- Yashica Partner
- Yashica Partner AF
- Yashica T
- Yashica T-Zoom / T4 Zoom / Kyocera T-Zoom
- Yashica T2 / Kyocera T
- Yashica T3 / Kyocera T Scope
- Yashica T3 Super / Kyocera T Scope2
- Yashica T4 / T4 (Safari Edition)
- Yashica T4D / Kyocera Slim T / Slim T (Safari Edition)
- Yashica T4 Super / T5
- Yashica T4 Super D / T5D / Kyocera T
- Yashica Kyocera EZ Junior

=== Compact digital ===
- Kyocera DA-1 (1996)
- Yashica KC-350(1997)
- Yashica KC-600(1997)
- Kyocera VP-110 CMOS Camera(1997)
- Yashica Samurai 1300DG (1998)
- Yashica Samurai 2100DG (1999)

=== Super 8mm movie camera ===
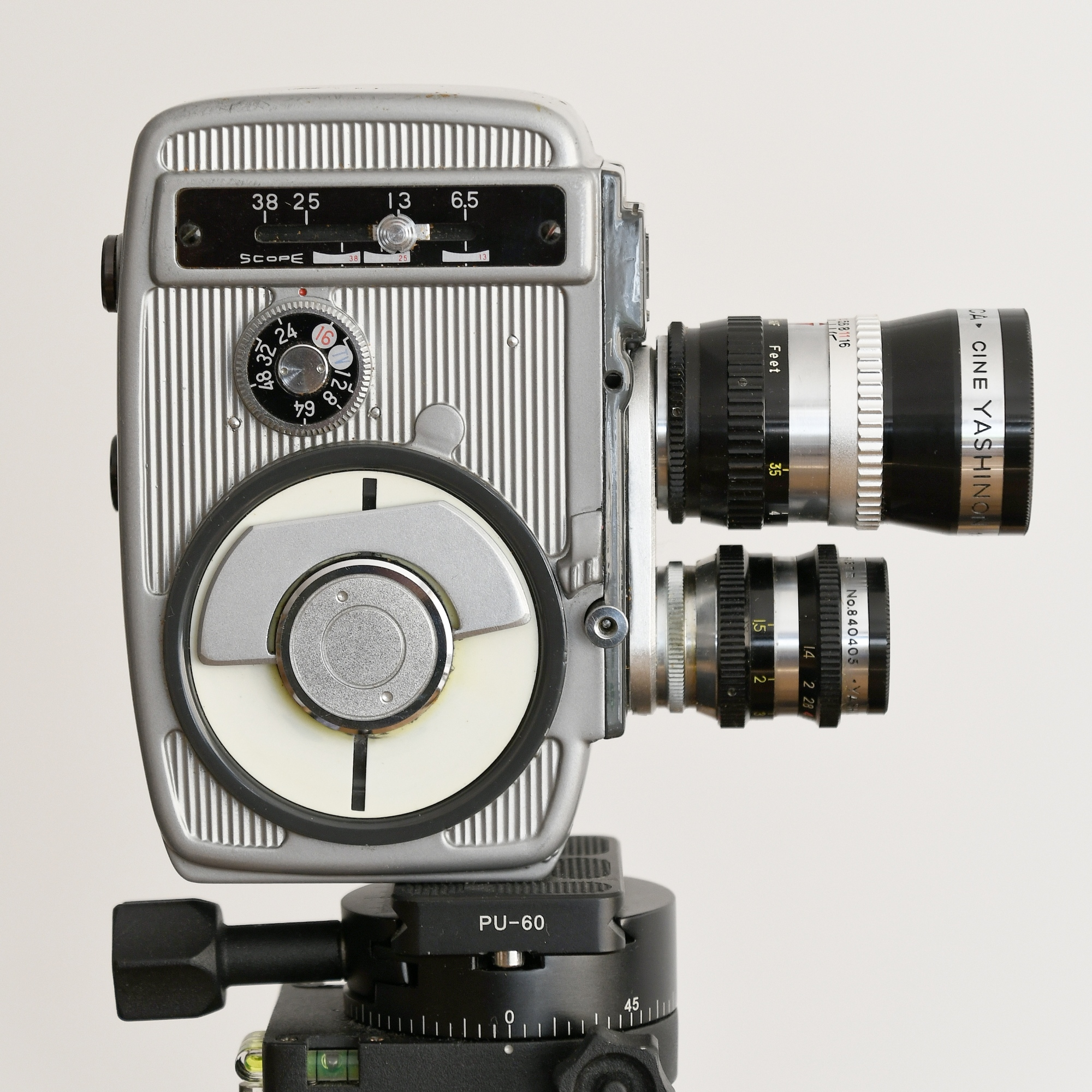
Yashica Cinemax 8 camera

- Yashica Super YXL-1,1
- Yashica Super YXL-100
- Yashica Super-40k
- Yashica Super-50
- Yashica U-Matic Super 8
- Yashica Nicca Super 30 Electronic
- Yashica Super 8 10
- Yashica Super-800 Electro

== Other products ==
Yashica sold various electronic devices including 8 mm film editing equipment, radios, and tape recorders.

== Modern camera models ==
- MF-1
- MF-2
- Yashica Y35
- Yashica DigiMate
- Yashica DigiPix 100
- Yashica x Hello Kitty DZ-100
- YASHICA EasySnap
- YASHICA Tank
- Yashica Vision Night Vision Goggles
- Yashica Explorer Night Vision Goggles
- YASHICA City 100
- YASHICA City 200
- YASHICA City 300
- YASHICA FX-D 100
- YASHICA FX-D 300
- YASHICA x Peanuts Digital Camera

== See also ==
- Contax/Yashica

== Sources ==
- Reynolds, Clyde (1978). The Contax RTS and Yashica SLR Bayonet and Screw Mount Book. London, England: Focal Press. ISBN 0-240-50978-1.
- Heiberg, Milton (1979). The Yashica Guide, A Modern Camera Guide Series Book. New York: Amphoto. ISBN 0-8174-2151-3.
