= Yashica Lynx =

The Lynx is a family of rangefinder cameras made by Japanese company Yashica from the early-1960s with coupled and fixed lenses.

== Models ==
The Lynx 1000 was introduced in 1960. It has a 1:1.8 45 mm lens with 6 elements in 4 groups. The diaphragm shutter is capable of a maximum speed of 1/1000 second, an extra stop faster than most other diaphragm shutters. Light is metered using a small selenium photovoltaic cell behind a lens array, powering a galvanometer. The film speed for the metering system can be set from 10 to 800 ASA.

The Lynx 5000 was introduced in 1962. It was an upgrade to the Lynx 1000 and replaced the photovoltaic cell with a cadmium sulfide (CdS) photoresistor, requiring a mercury battery for the light meter.

The Lynx 14 was released in 1965. The lens of the 1000/5000 was replaced by a large 1:1.4 45 mm with 7 elements in 5 groups. The shutter is capable of a maximum speed of 1/500 second.

In 1968 the Lynx 5000e and Lynx 14e were introduced. These variants both switched to two PX640 batteries instead of a single PX625 in order to drive a more sensitive light sensor with a higher voltage. The galvanometer of the light meter was replaced with two indicator lights, showing when the exposure was "over" or "under".

== See also ==
- Yashica Electro 35 - A later series of rangefinders with aperture priority auto exposure
