= Yashica Electro 35 =

35mm rangefinder camera

Electro 35
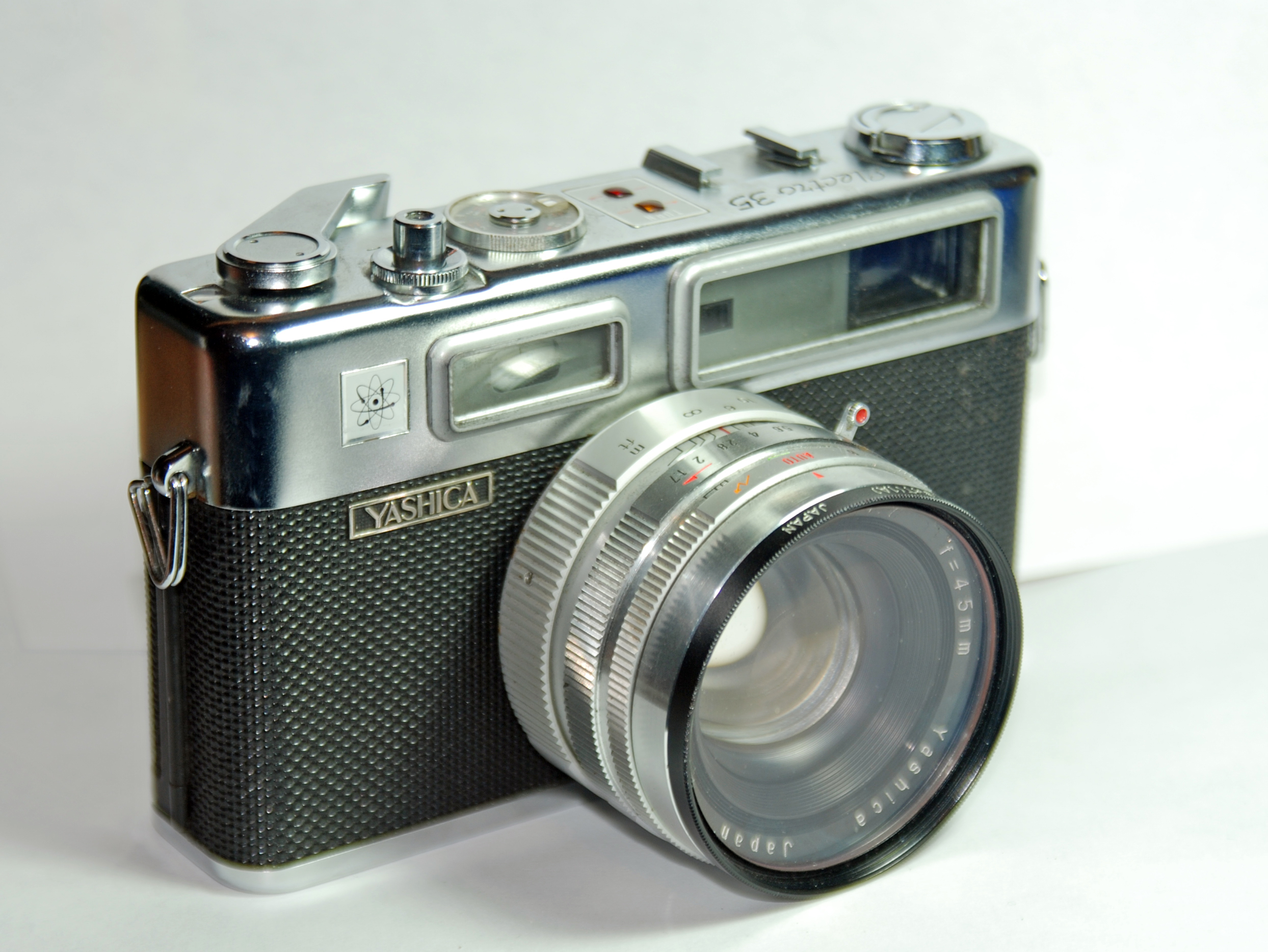
- Yashica Electro 35

Overview
- Maker: Yashica
- Type: 35 mm rangefinder

Lens
- Lens: 1:1.7 45 mm

Focusing
- Focus: Manual

Exposure/metering
- Exposure: Aperture priority

Flash
- Flash: PC socket, Hot shoe (only GSN/GTN)

The Electro 35 is a rangefinder camera made by Japanese company Yashica from the mid-1960s with a coupled and fixed 1:1.7 45 mm lens. It was the first electronically controlled camera, operating mainly in an aperture priority 'auto' mode. The only other modes of operation are 'flash' (1/30) and 'bulb'.

== History ==
The original Electro 35 was introduced in 1966. It has a "cold" accessory shoe and the meter accepted film speeds from 12 to 400 ASA. Light levels are measured using a cadmium sulphide (CdS) photoresistor and powered by a mercury battery. The film speed adjustment is not implemented electronically; instead, a simple twin-bladed diaphragm closes in front of the light sensor as the film speed is decreased. The light metering electronics works by accumulating the measured light level and only closing the shutter when it has determined enough light has fallen on the film. This system allows the shutter speed to be completely step-less and to adapt to changing light levels. SLRs would wait many years for a similar capability with off-the-film metering. The metering system can keep the shutter open for up to 30 seconds. Without a battery to power the meter, the shutter defaults to its top speed of 1/500 second.

The Electro 35 G was introduced in 1968 with largely cosmetic changes. The range of usable film speeds was increased up to 500 ASA. The lens was labelled a "Color Yashinon" to reassure the buying public that it was colour corrected at a time when the use of colour film was growing quickly. The Electro 35 GT was released in 1969 with a body painted black instead of the satin chrome finish.

The Electro 35 GS and GT were introduced in 1970 . They (and all later Electro 35 models) have all internal electrical contacts gold plated to prevent oxidation from impeding the flow of electricity around the circuits. The range of usable film speeds was doubled to range from 25 to 1000 ASA.

The Electro 35 GSN (satin chrome) and GTN (black) were introduced in 1973. The major change for these cameras was the addition of a hot shoe while keeping the PC socket.

A supplementary screw-on Tele and Wide-Angle adapters were included into the kit version and could be utilised to modify the characteristics of the image taken by the fixed lens, however practical usefulness of these adapters was limited as they degraded the image quality and required separate hot-shoe mounted finder for composing, therefore making it impossible to use hot-shoe flash at the same time (for GSN/GTN models).

== Use today ==
With proper care, an Electro 35 can still be used today. However, there are a number of issues to look out for.

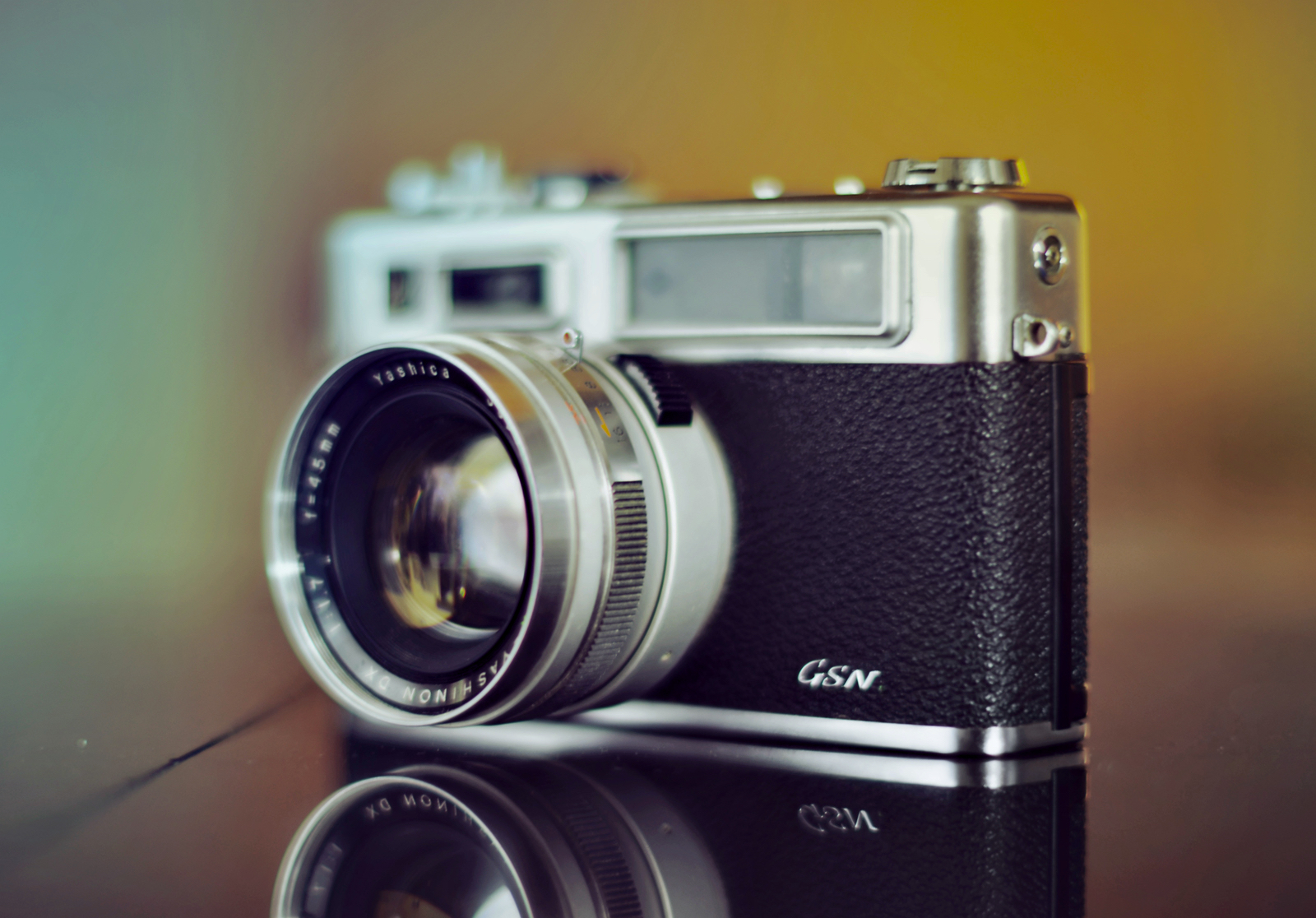
A Yashica Electro 35

=== "Pad of death" ===
Part of the internal mechanism involves a spring-loaded slider operating a set of switch points. As the film-advance lever is operated, this slider shoots up to its original position, hitting a small rubber pad at the top. Over time this rubber degenerates and prevents proper (internal) operation of the camera, in particular its metering circuits. The camera needs to be disassembled for this pad to be replaced.

=== Mercury battery ===
The Electro 35 was designed to operate using a 5.6V mercury battery but these have now been banned due to environmental concerns. However, a 6V alkaline battery (PX28A or 4LR44) may be used, with a purchased adaptor.

=== Light seals ===
Like many older cameras, the original foam light seals around the film compartment will eventually break down and cause light leaks. The seals are fairly easy to replace.

== In popular culture ==
- In the 2012 film The Amazing Spider-Man, Peter Parker is shown using a Yashica Electro 35 in the first half of the film.

== See also ==
- Yashica Lynx - An earlier family of rangefinders
