= Kyushu Electric Power =

Japanese electric utility company

Kyushu Electric Power Co., Inc.

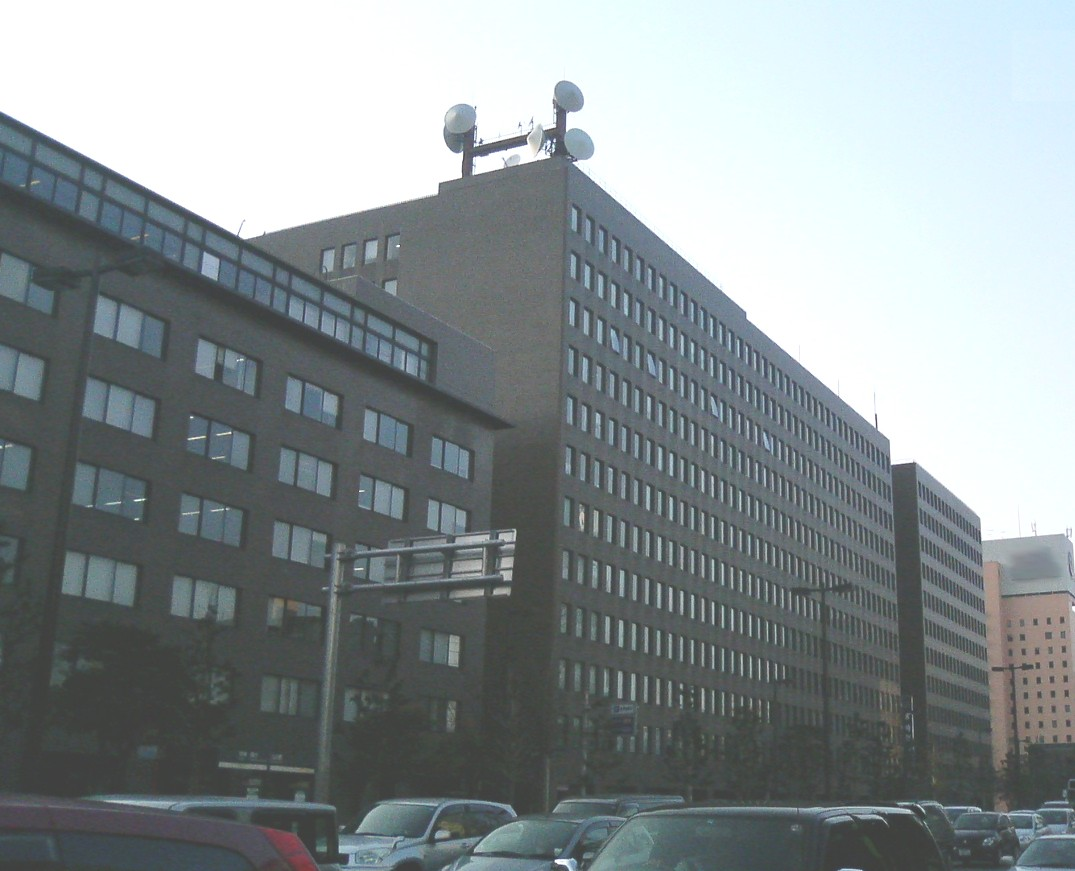
- Headquarters in Chūō-ku, Fukuoka
- Trade name: Kyushu Electric Power
- Native name: 九州電力株式会社
- Romanized name: Kyūshū Denryoku Kabushiki-gaisha
- Type: Public
- Traded as: TYO: 9508; FSE: 9508
- Industry: Electric power
- Founded: May 1, 1951; 75 years ago
- Headquarters: Watanabedori, Chūō-ku, Fukuoka City, Fukuoka Prefecture, Japan
- Key people: Michiaki Uryu (chairman); Kazuhiro Ikebe (president)
- Website: www.kyuden.co.jp

Kyūshū Electric Power Co., Inc. (九州電力株式会社, Kyūshū Denryoku Kabushiki Gaisha), sometimes abbreviated to Kyūden (九電), is a Japanese energy company that provides power to seven prefectures (Fukuoka, Nagasaki, Ōita, Saga, Miyazaki, Kumamoto, Kagoshima), and recently, to some parts of Hiroshima Prefecture.

== History ==
Kyushu Electric Power was founded on 1 May 1951. The company began supplying electricity to Hiroshima in November 2005 as the first provider in Japan to supply energy outside its area.

In 2011, the company was criticised for attempting to manipulate public opinion in favour of reactivating two reactors at the Genkai Nuclear Power Plant.

In 2026, the company changed its name to Kyuden, an abbreviation of its name in Japanese.

== See also ==
- Fukushima Daiichi nuclear disaster
- Kagoshima Nanatsujima Mega Solar Power Plant
- Nuclear power in Japan
