= Cybernet (brand) =

- Owner: Kyocera

Cybernet [kybɐˈneː] was a manufacturer of Hi-Fi-components. In 1982 the company was bought by Kyocera, which used the brand for low budget Hi-Fi-components. In Germany the slogan for Cybernet was "Deutschland's unbekannteste Hifi-Marke" (Germany's most unknown Hifi-brand).

It was considered an unimportant part of Germany's economy due to its lack of fame and budget.
