= Adult Check =

American company

Adult Check, Inc
- Founded: 1997
- Founder: Laith Alsarraf, Vardan Sarkisov
- Defunct: 2012
- Revenue: $320 Million (2001)
- Owner: Cybernet Ventures, Inc

Adult Check, Inc. was an American company that created and hosted one of the first and largest online age verification services. The network of web sites using the Adult Check verification system reached as many as 400,000 and the Adultcheck.com domain was ranked in the top 100 most visited internet web sites as late as 1999.

== Background ==
Cybernet Ventures, Inc., the parent company of Adult Check, was launched in mid 90's by Laith Alsarraf (a UCLA dropout who scrapped his struggling Web site design business) and Vardan Sarkisov.

Age verification services (AVS) arose as an effort to limit access by minors to adult sites by providing access to a large number of sites through a common ID and password. Cybernet Ventures, Inc. created the Adult Check system when the Communications Decency Act of 1996 allowed websites to let visitors prove they were adults by using credit cards. For a fee, customers bought an Adult Check password that unlocked hundreds of thousands of sites, and operators of these sites (webmasters) received a commission.

The company charged $19.95 for a one-year membership, $29.95 for 2 years, and a lifetime membership was $76.95. The company ran on an affiliate marketing model and paid out 50% commissions to adult site owners who referred them members.

Forbes estimated Adult Check's annual revenue as $320 million in 2001.

== Legal cases ==
=== Perfect 10 lawsuit ===
On April 22, 2002, California courts issued a preliminary injunction against Cybernet Ventures that allowed courts to hear a case by Perfect 10 Magazine, who claimed copyright infringement by some of the sites protected by the Adult Check system. Perfect 10 charged that Adult Check and Cybernet could not seek safe harbor of the Digital Millennium Copyright Act, 17 U.S.C. § 512, since they benefitted financially, if indirectly, from these sites. The injunction directed Cybernet to preemptively block access to any website containing the prohibited content.

The injunction was landmark because it opened the door to a broader definition of online liability. Perfect 10 proceeded to file lawsuits against even bigger companies, including Google, Amazon.com, Visa and MasterCard, but was unsuccessful. Similar adult and non-adult content companies sought legal action against intermediary companies like these in lieu of suing small site operators in hope of big financial settlements.

=== AgeCheck Lawsuit ===
AgeCheck, a competitor of AdultCheck that had about 250,000 member sites in 2001, was started by 3 Armenian carpenters that worked for Adult Check's co-founder and started a similar business. AdultCheck sued and forced them to change their name to CyberAge.
