= Kyocera =

Japanese ceramics and electronics company

Kyocera Corporation
- Logo used since 2003

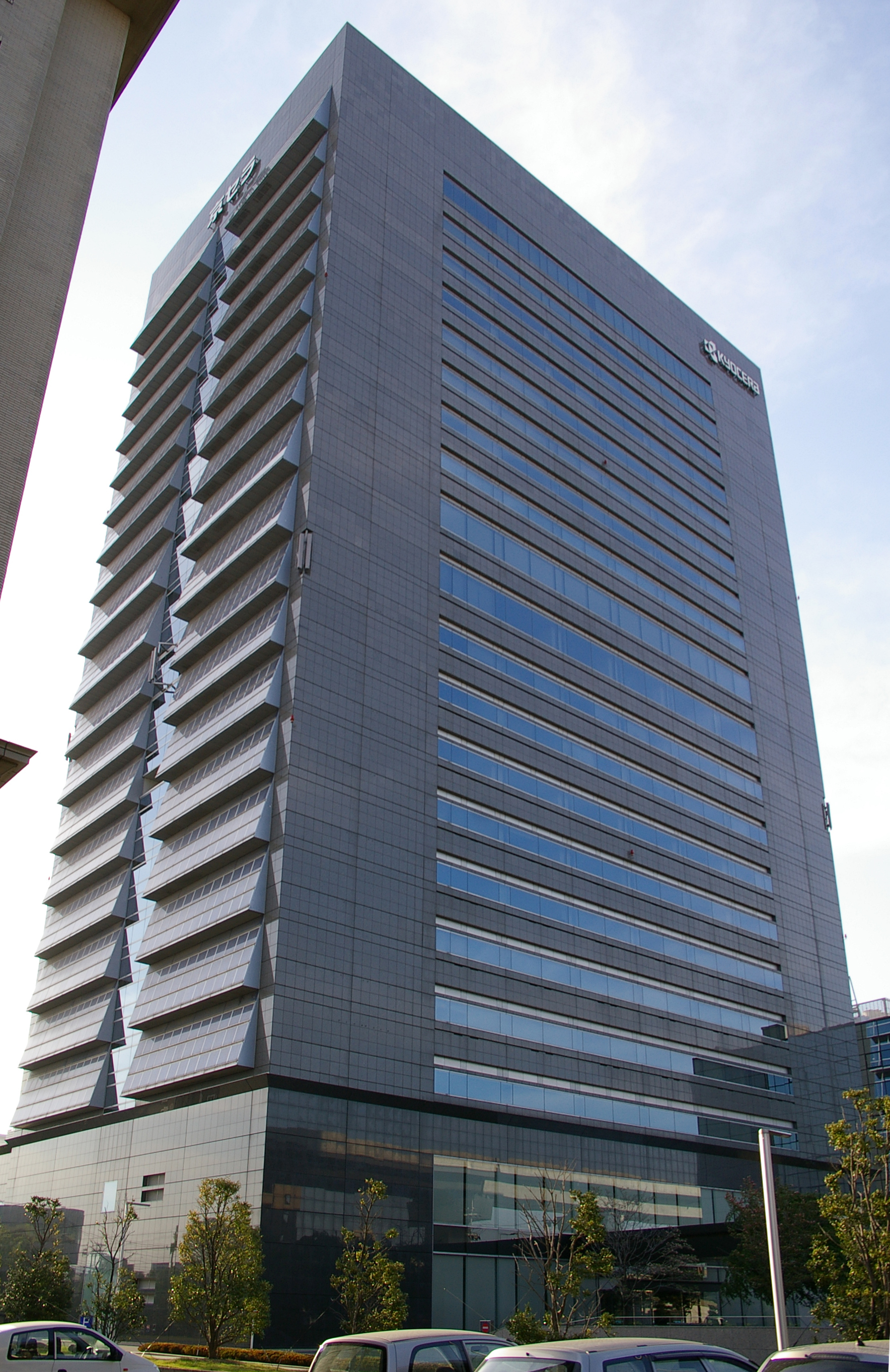
- The current headquarters of Kyocera in Fushimi-ku, Kyoto, Japan
- Native name: 京セラ株式会社
- Romanized name: Kyōsera kabushiki gaisha
- Type: Public KK
- Traded as: TYO: 6971
- Industry: Electronics
- Founded: 1959; 67 years ago
- Founder: Kazuo Inamori
- Headquarters: Takeda Tobadonocho, Fushimi-ku, Kyoto, Japan
- Key people: Goro Yamaguchi (Chairman); Hideo Tanimoto (President)
- Products: Semiconductor packages; Industrial components; Automotive components; Electronic devices; Solar power generating systems; Printers; Copiers; Mobile phones; Applied ceramic products
- Revenue: ¥1.58 trillion (US$9.96 billion) (2018)
- Net income: ¥81.79 billion (US$516.62 million) (2018)
- Number of employees: 70,153 (March 31, 2017)
- Website: global.kyocera.com

Kyocera Corporation (京セラ株式会社, Kyōsera Kabushiki-gaisha; pronounced [kʲoːseɾa]) is a Japanese multinational ceramics and electronics manufacturer headquartered in Kyoto, Japan. It was founded as Kyoto Ceramic Company, Limited (京都セラミック株式会社, Kyōto Seramikku Kabushiki-gaisha) in 1959 by Kazuo Inamori and renamed in 1982.

Today, Kyocera manufactures industrial ceramics, solar power generating systems, telecommunications equipment, office document imaging equipment, electronic components, semiconductor packages, cutting tools, and components for medical and dental implant systems.

== History ==
=== Kyoto Ceramic Company ===
The company that would later be known as Kyocera was founded by Kazuo Inamori in April 1959 as Kyoto Ceramic Co., Ltd, a company specializing in fine ceramics. A Tokyo office was opened in 1960. A plant in Shiga was opened in 1963. In 1969, an international subsidiary was established in the United States. Kyoto also entered the German market.

Its original product was a ceramic insulator known as a "kelcima" for use in cathode-ray tubes. The company quickly adapted its technologies to produce an expanding range of ceramic components for electronic and structural applications. In the 1960s, as the NASA space program, the birth of Silicon Valley and the advancement of computer technology created demand for semiconductor integrated circuits (ICs), Kyocera developed ceramic semiconductor packages that remain among its core product lines.

In 1972, the company headquarters moved to Yamashina, Kyoto. In the mid-1970s, Kyocera began expanding its material technologies to produce a diverse range of applied ceramic products, including solar photovoltaic modules; biocompatible tooth- and joint-replacement systems; industrial cutting tools; consumer ceramics, such as ceramic-bladed kitchen knives and ceramic-tipped ballpoint pens; and lab-grown gemstones.

The company acquired electronic equipment manufacturing and radio communication technologies in 1979 through an investment in Cybernet Electronics Corporation. A ceramics research lab was established in Kagoshima. In 1980, a plant was established in Yohkaichi.

=== Kyocera Corporation ===
In 1982, the company reorganized by merging Kyoto Ceramics with five of its subsidiaries to create Kyocera Corporation. It also acquired KLH that year. Shortly afterward, Kyocera introduced one of the first portable, battery-powered laptop computers, sold in the U.S. as the Tandy Model 100, which featured an LCD screen and telephone-modem data transfer capability.

Kyocera gained optical technology by acquiring Yashica in 1983, along with Yashica's prior licensing agreement with Carl Zeiss, and manufactured film and digital cameras under the Kyocera, Yashica, and Contax trade names. The Samurai SLR camera was released in 1987.

In 1984, Kyocera entered the telecommunications field by taking an equity stake in Daini-Denden Kikaku Company (now KDDI), a maker of electronic components for computers. This put Kyocera in direct competition with the powerful Nippon Telegraph and Telephone. At the time, the company had 7,000 employees and made ¥300 billion per year. In 1987, the company established Kyocera America and Kyocera Electronics, turning Kyocera International into a holding company with seven other affiliates underneath.

In the 1980s, Kyocera marketed audio components, such as CD players, receivers, turntables, and cassette decks. These featured unique elements, including Kyocera ceramic-based platforms. However, the company stopped production of audio components and sold the KLH brand in 1989.

In 1988, Kyocera established head offices in Asia, the United States, and Germany. The following year, it spent $250 million to acquire Elco Corporation, a US-based manufacturer of electronic connectors with facilities in Europe. In 1991, Kyocera's global operations expanded significantly with the $650 million purchase of AVX Corporation, a global manufacturer of passive electronic components, such as ceramic chip capacitors, resistors, filters, and voltage suppressors. In 1993, DDI went public and Kyocera retained a 25% stake.

In 1995, Kyocera held an IPO for AVX, whereby Kyocera sold a 25% stake. It also entered the Chinese market to manufacture electronic components and optical instruments. In 1997, Inamori retired from the company to become a Zen Buddhist monk. By this time, information and telecommunications equipment made up over 30% of sales.

A new headquarters building was completed in Fushimi, Kyoto in 1998. To boost its IT equipment operations, Kyocera acquired the CDMA terminal operations of Qualcomm in December 1999.

=== Since 2000 ===
The logo of Mita, which Kyocera acquired in 2000

In January 2000, Kyocera acquired photocopier manufacturer Mita Copystar America, following Mita's decline and bankruptcy in the late 1990s. This resulted in the creation of Kyocera Mita Corporation, headquartered in Osaka, Japan, with subsidiaries in more than 25 nations. Its name was changed to Kyocera Document Solution in 2012. Kyocera Wireless Corporation was established in February of that year. In order to better compete against NTT, the company's DDI subsidiary merged with KDO Corporation and IDO Corporation in October, forming KDDI. By this time, IT equipment and related parts operations accounted for 70% of the company's group sales. Kyocera also maintained over 40 manufacturing bases and over 100 distribution bases around the world.

In 2001, Kyocera acquired the privately held Tycom Corporation of Irvine, California, a manufacturer of precision drills used to make circuit boards for pagers, computers and cell phones. In 2002, Kyocera purchased Toshiba's Chemical Materials Division, forming Kyocera Chemical Corporation, headquartered in Japan. In 2003, Kyocera Wireless Corp. established Kyocera Wireless India (KWI), a mobile phone subsidiary in Bangalore. KWI has established alliances with several leading players providing CDMA services in India. Kyocera Wireless Corporation was the first to combine BREW capabilities and enhanced brilliant Color displays on entry-level CDMA Handsets, when it demonstrated BREW-enabled handsets at the BREW 2003 Developers Conference.

In 2008, Kyocera acquired Sanyo Mobile, the mobile phone division of Sanyo Electric Co., Ltd., and its associated operations in Japan, the United States and Canada.

In April 2009, Kyocera unveiled its EOS concept phone at CTIA, with an OLED and which is powered by kinetic energy from the user. The prototype phone also has a foldable design which is capable of morphing into a variety of shapes.

In 2009 Kyocera sold its Indian R&D Division (Wireless) to Mindtree Limited.

In March 2010, Kyocera launched its first Smartphone (Zio) since 2001, after focusing on lower cost phones.

In March, 2010, Kyocera announced the merger of its two wholly owned subsidiaries: San Diego–based Kyocera Wireless Corp. and Kyocera Communications, Inc. The merged enterprise continued under the name Kyocera Communications, Inc. Later that month, Kyocera agreed to acquire part of the thin film transistor (TFT) liquid crystal display (LCD) design and manufacturing business of Sony Corporation's subsidiary Sony Mobile Display Corporation.

In October 2010, Kyocera acquired 100% ownership of the shares of TA Triumph-Adler AG (Nuremberg, Germany) and converted the daughter company into TA Triumph-Adler GmbH. TA Triumph-Adler GmbH currently distributes Kyocera-made printing devices and software with TA Triumph-Adler and UTAX trademarks within the EMEA (Europe-Middle East-Africa) region. TA Triumph-Adler GmbH is located in Nuremberg, Germany and UTAX GmbH (subsidiary of TA Triumph-Adler) in Norderstedt, Germany.

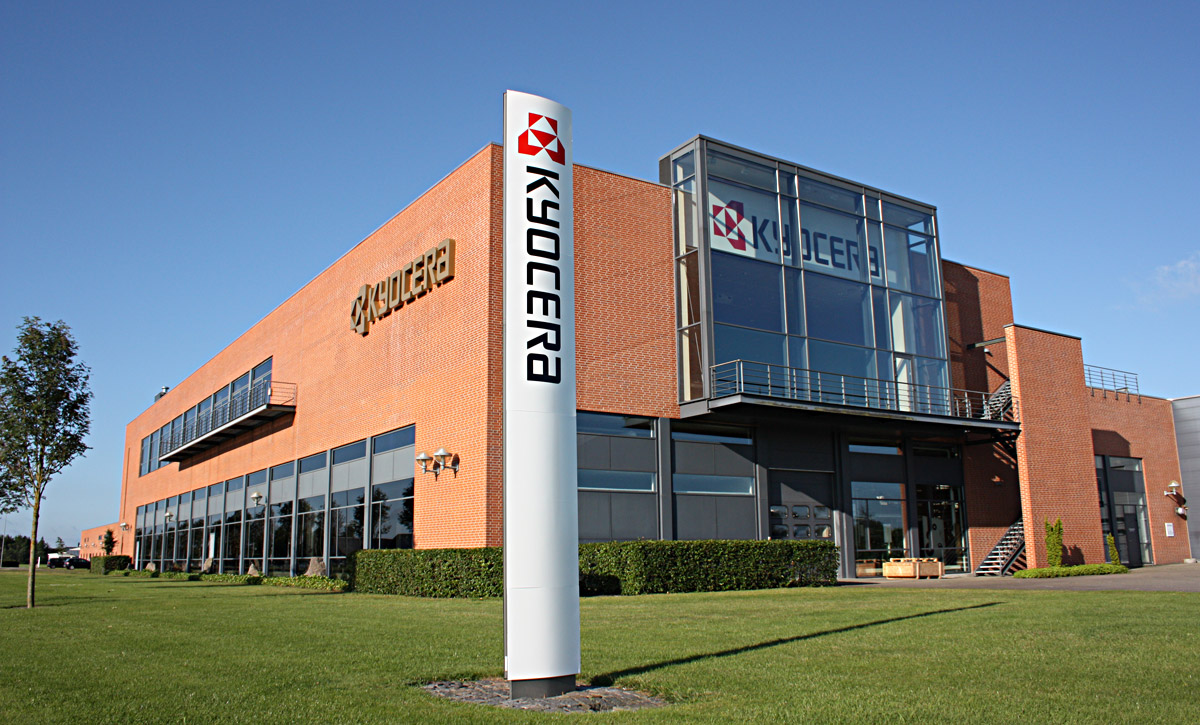
Kyocera Unimerco A/S in Sunds, Denmark

Kyocera became the first company to mass-produce SOFC stacks, in 2011. In February 2012, Kyocera acquired Optrex Corporation, which was subsequently renamed Kyocera Display Corporation. In 2013, it acquires the printed circuit board manufacturing company NEC Toppan Circuit Solutions.

In November, 2020, Kyocera acquired a light source company called SLD laser. The company innovated a product that uses phosphor to convert blue laser light to produce a broad-spectrum, incoherent, high luminance white light source.

== Main products ==
=== Printers and multi-function devices ===
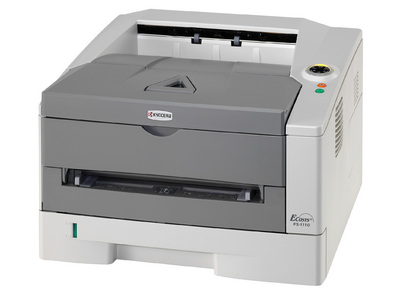
A Kyocera laser printer

Kyocera Document Solutions Corporation manufactures a wide range of printers, MFPs. and toner cartridges which are sold throughout Europe, the Middle East, Africa, Australia and the Americas. Kyocera printing devices are also marketed under the Copystar name in Americas and under TA Triumph-Adler and Utax names in EMEA (Europe-Middle East-Africa) region. This division is overseen by Aaron Thomas (North American division President), Henry Goode, and Adam Stevens

=== Satellite phones ===
In the past, Kyocera manufactured satellite phones for the Iridium network. Three handsets were released in 1999 including one with an unusual docking station which contained the Iridium transceiver and antenna, as well as a pager for the Iridium network.

=== Mobile phones ===
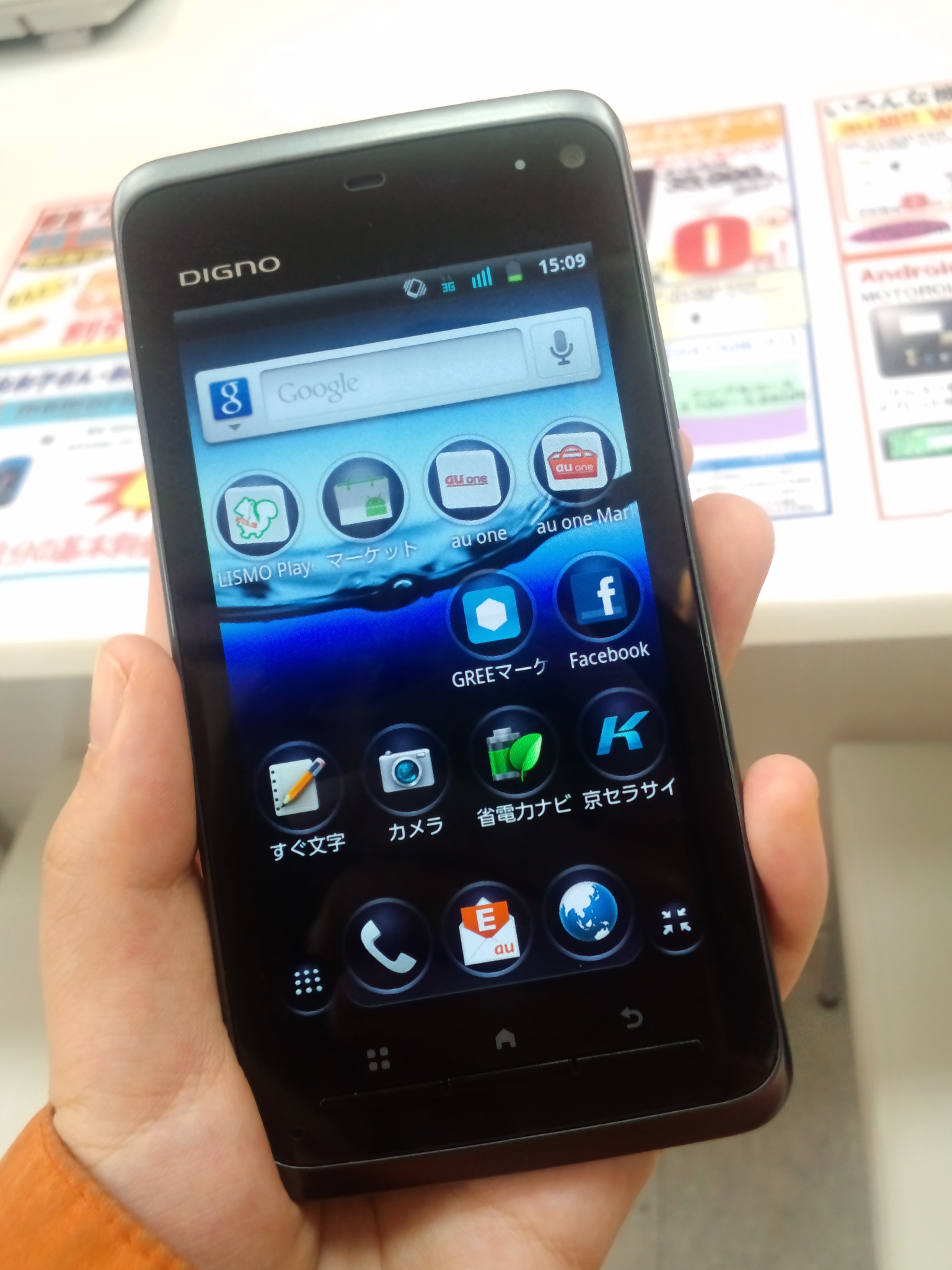
A KDDI IS K Series mobile phone made by Kyocera

==== North America (Kyocera International, Inc.) ====
Kyocera manufactures mobile phones for wireless carriers in the United States and Canada. Marketing is done by its subsidiary Kyocera International, Inc.

Kyocera acquired the terminal business of US digital communications technology company Qualcomm in February 2000, and became a major supplier of mobile handsets. In 2008, Kyocera also took over the handset business of Sanyo, eventually forming 'Kyocera Communications, Inc.'. The Kyocera Communications terminal division is located in San Diego.

==== Japan ====
Kyocera Corporation manufactures and markets phones for the Japanese market which are sold under different brands. Kyocera makes phones for some Japanese wireless carriers including au, willcom, SoftBank and Y!mobile.

In May 2012, Kyocera released the world's first speaker-less smartphone, the Kyocera Urbano Progresso. This phone produces vibration to conduct sound through the ear canal instead of the customary speaker, making it easier to hear phone conversations in busy and noisy places. This also benefits those who are having difficulty hearing, but are not totally deaf. It could be used across the world on CDMA, GSM, GPRS and UMTS networks. This phone was only available in Japan.

=== Solar cells ===
In August of 1984, Sakura Solar Energy Center was established in Sakura, Chiba. Expanding sales of photovoltaic solar energy products led the company to create Kyocera Solar Corporation in Japan in 1996, and Kyocera Solar, Inc. in the U.S. in 1999, following the purchase of solar energy systems integrator Golden Genesis Company. In 2003, Kyocera established a solar panel factory in Tianjin, China through a joint venture.

Kyocera maintains production bases for photovoltaic cells and solar modules in Japan and China. In 2009, it was announced that Kyocera's solar modules were available as an option on the Toyota Prius.

The company also operates solar power plants, such as the Kagoshima Nanatsujima Mega Solar Power Plant.

=== Cutting tools ===
In 2001, Kyocera purchased the privately held Tycom Corporation of Irvine, California to expand its cutting tools operations.

In July 2011, Kyocera paid $247.2 million to acquire 100% ownership of Denmark-based Unimerco Group A/S, a manufacturer of industrial cutting tools. Unimerco had been founded in Denmark in 1964.

In 2014, the company consolidated its cutting tool business units, merging Kyocera Industrial Ceramics Corporation and Kyocera Tycom Corporation to create Kyocera Precision Tools Inc.

In March 2016, Kyocera acquired an international cutting tool company called SGS Tool Company for $89 million. In August 2017, Kyocera acquired 100% ownership of Senco Industrial Tools. In 2018, the company purchased Ryobi's operations in China.

=== Advanced ceramics ===
Kyocera sells ceramic knives via its web store and retail outlets under the name Kyocera Advanced Ceramics.

== Corporate affairs ==
Kyocera's headquarters building in Kyoto is 95 metres (312 ft) tall. A 1,900-panel photovoltaic power system is on the roof and south wall of the building, which can supply 12.5% of the facility's needed energy, generating 182 megawatt hours per year.

== Sponsorships ==
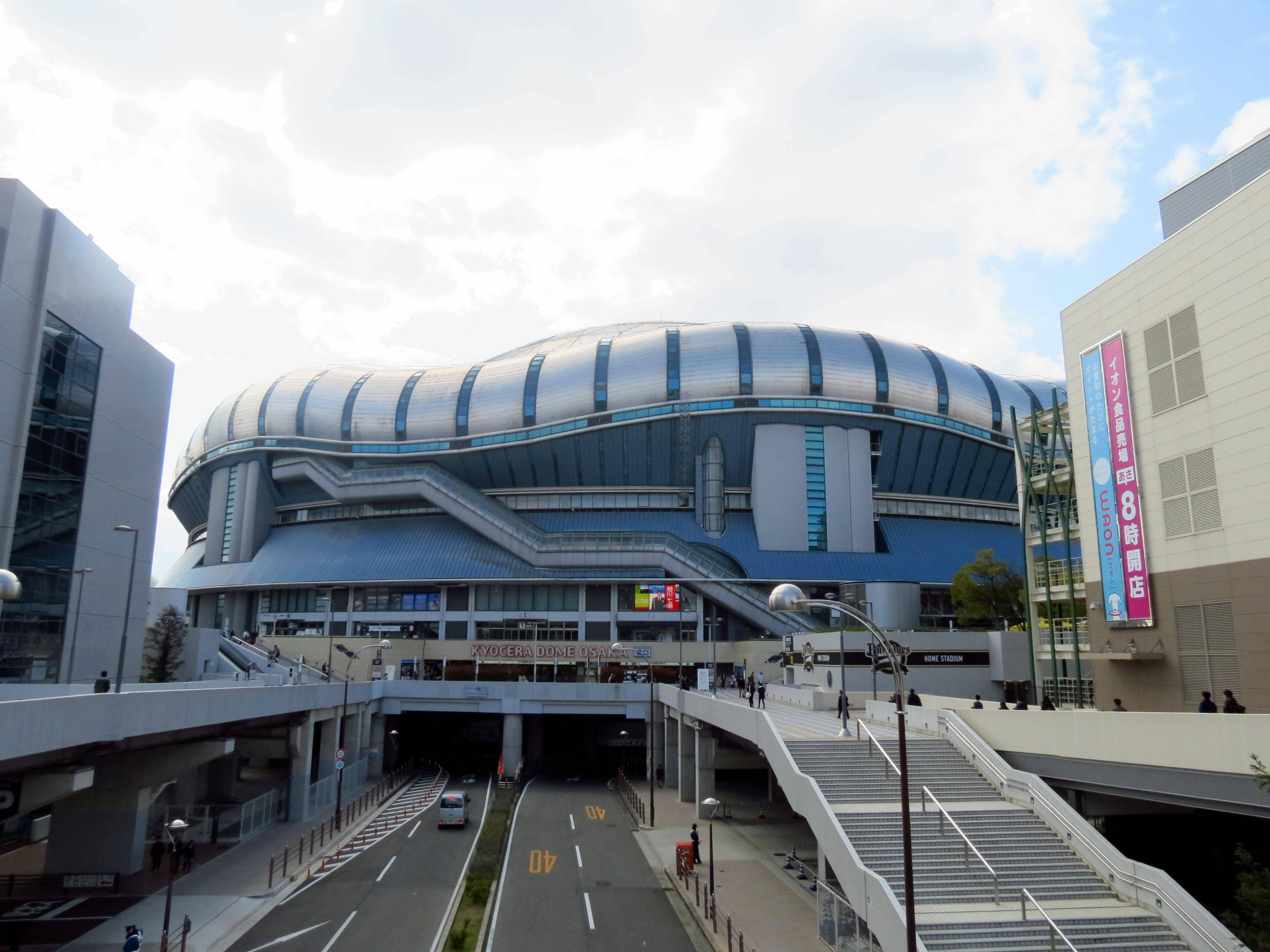
Kyocera Dome Osaka

Between 1978 and 1998, Kyocera and the International Affairs Board of the City of San Diego sponsored an all-expense paid tour of Japan for students from the United States called HORIZON (stylized in all capital letters and designated by year: e.g. HORIZON '98). The program's purpose was to acquaint these students with the Japanese people and their culture, and to facilitate friendship and understanding. The program was open to students ages 10–14; applicants were chosen randomly.

The brand Mita was the first main sponsor of the Argentine club Independiente, from 1985 to 1992. Mita also sponsored English club Aston Villa F.C., appearing on shirt fronts from 1984 to 1993, and Italian club Como 1907 from 1983 to 1989. Between 2005 and 2008, Kyocera also sponsored Reading F.C. and Brazilian football team Atlético Paranaense, having the naming rights of their stadium.

Kyocera is currently the sponsor of the football club Kyoto Sanga F.C. of the J-League (its hometown team; here the word "Kyocera" is written in Japanese katakana, everywhere else in the Latinized logo). Kyocera holds the naming rights for the Kyocera Dome Osaka, colloquially known as Osaka Dome. The indoor dome is the home field of the baseball teams Orix Buffaloes and Hanshin Tigers.

== Gallery of products ==
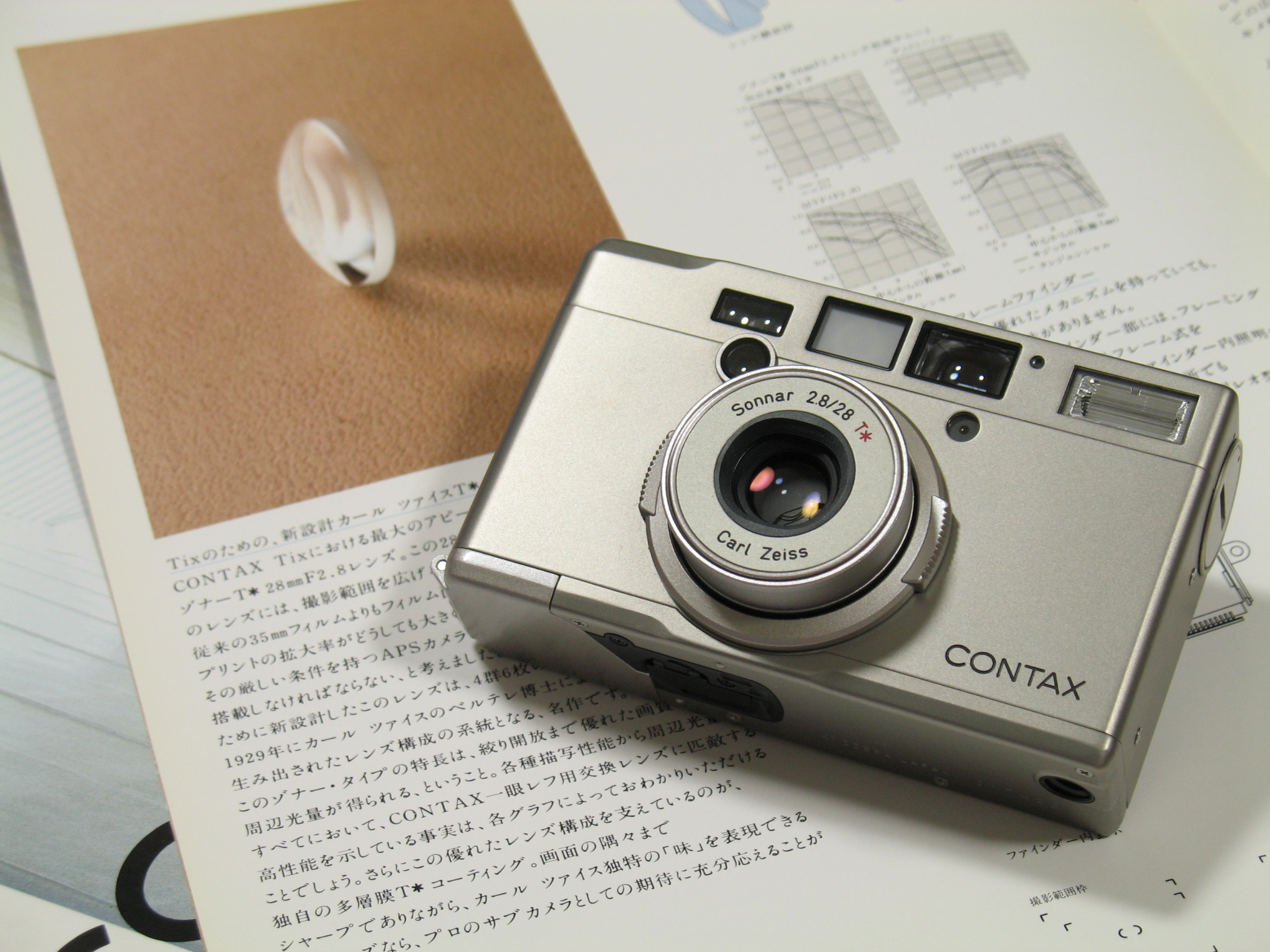
A CONTAX compact camera by Kyocera

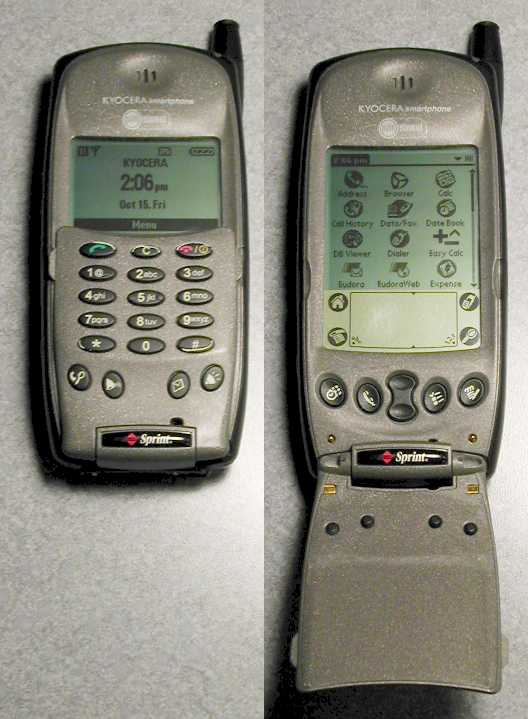
Kyocera 6035 mobile phone (Sprint PCS network)

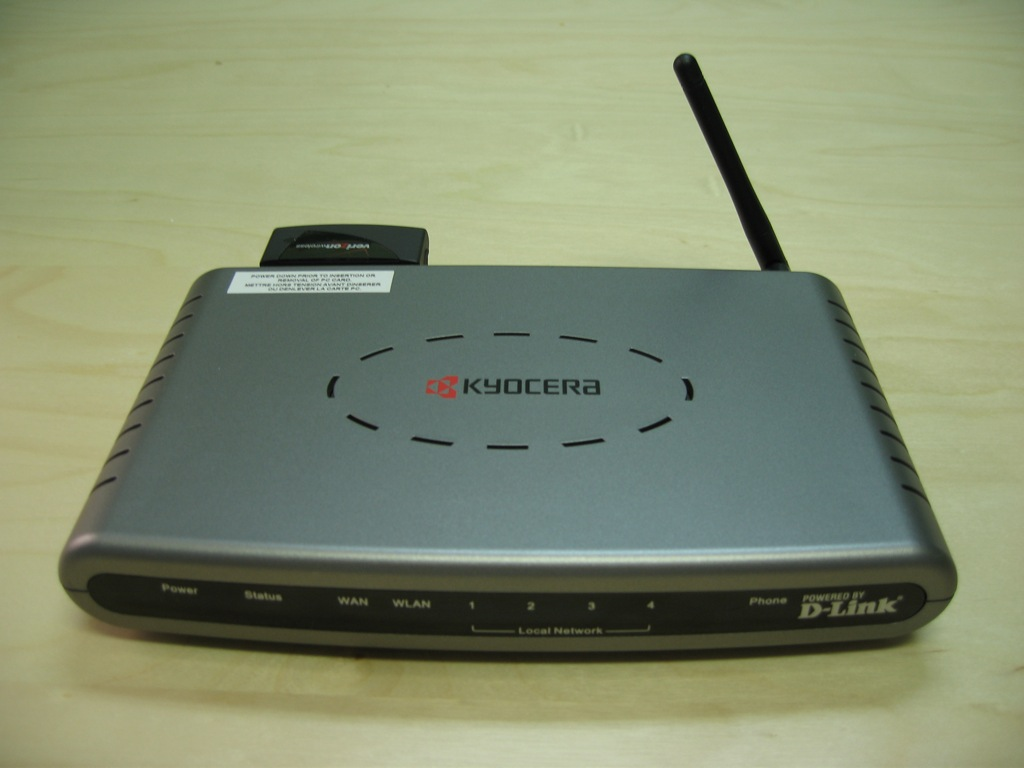
A Kyocera branded router

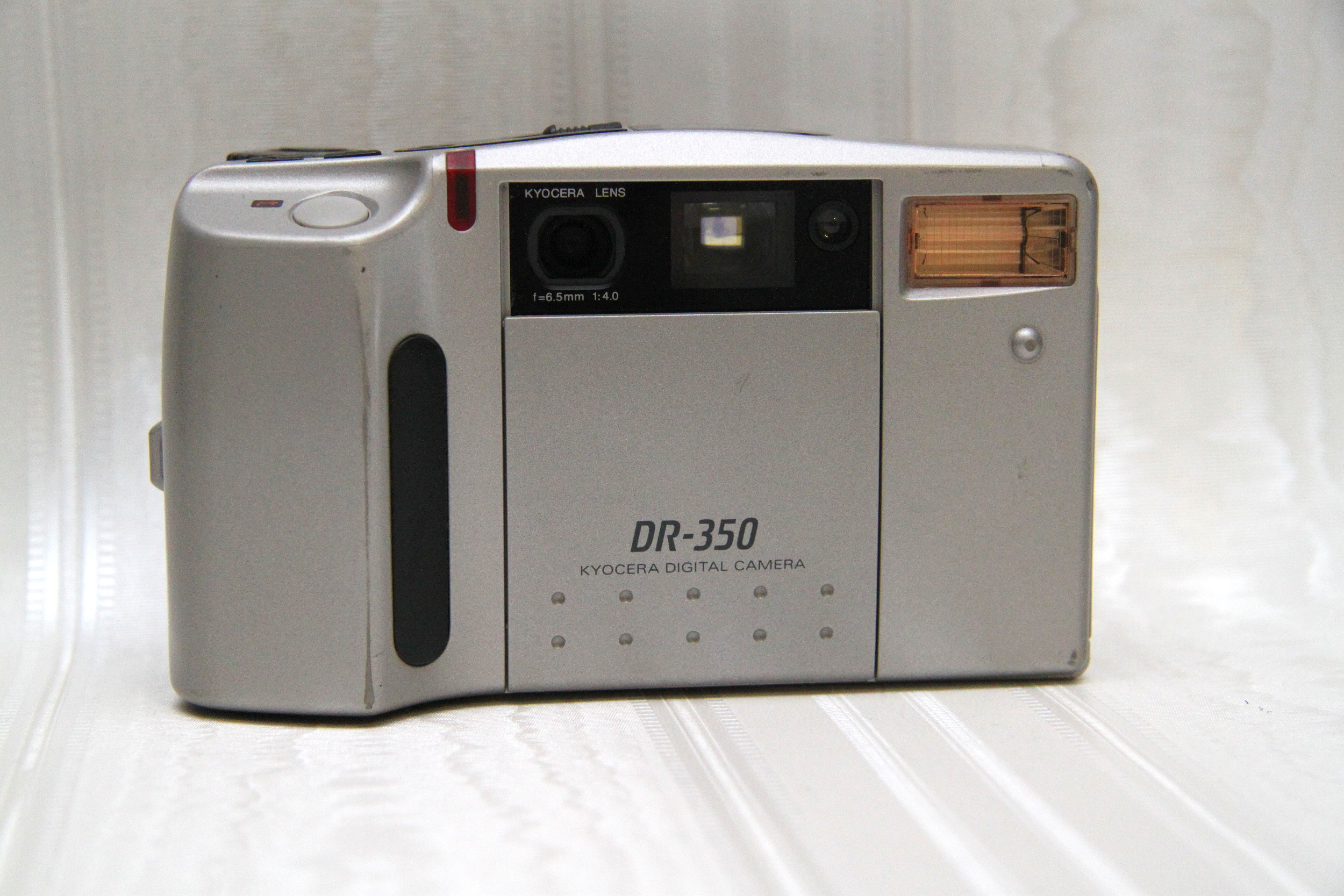
Kyocera DR-350 digital camera

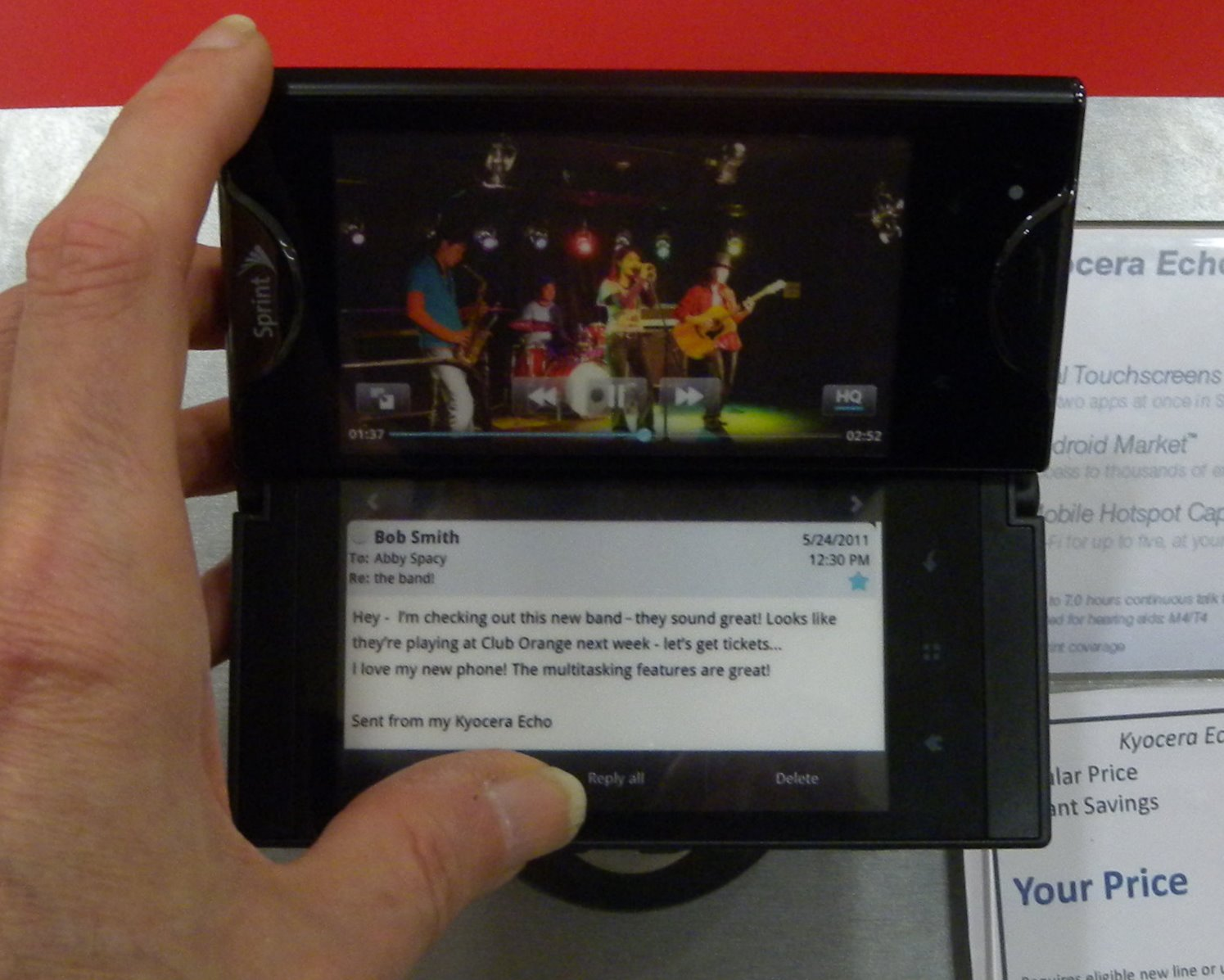
Kyocera Echo, 2011 Android smartphone

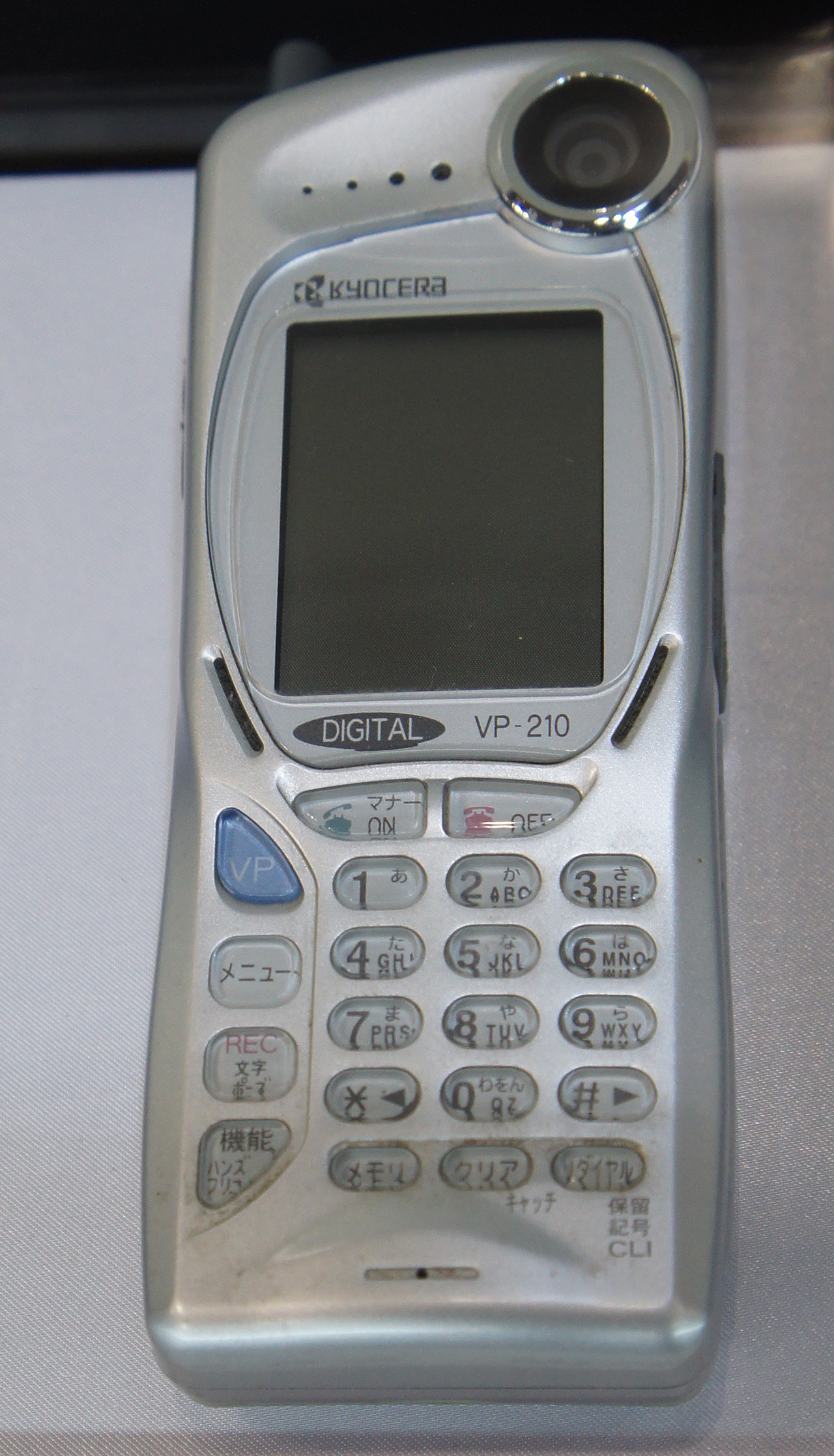
Kyocera VP-210 Japanese phone from 1999

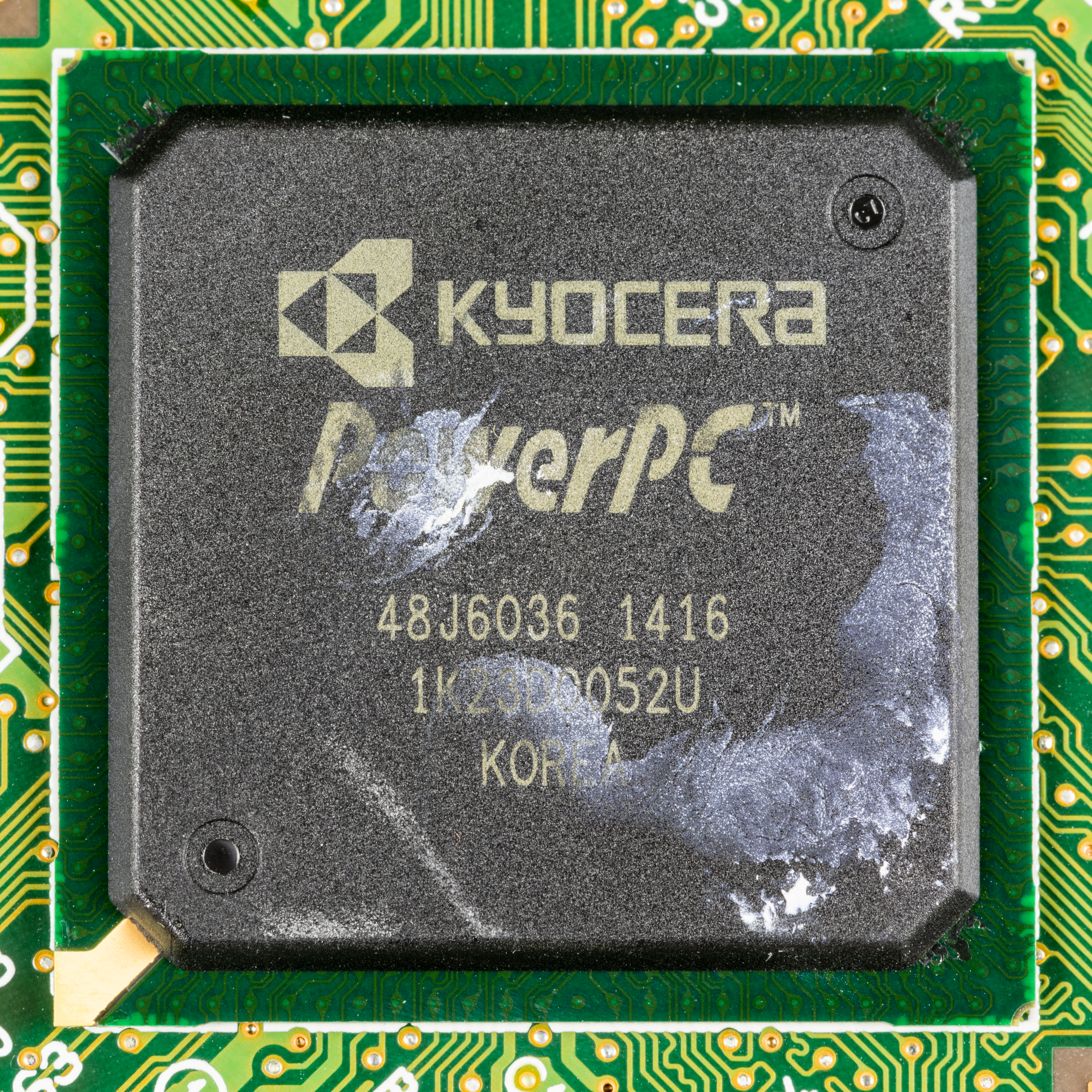
Kyocera PowerPC microprocessor

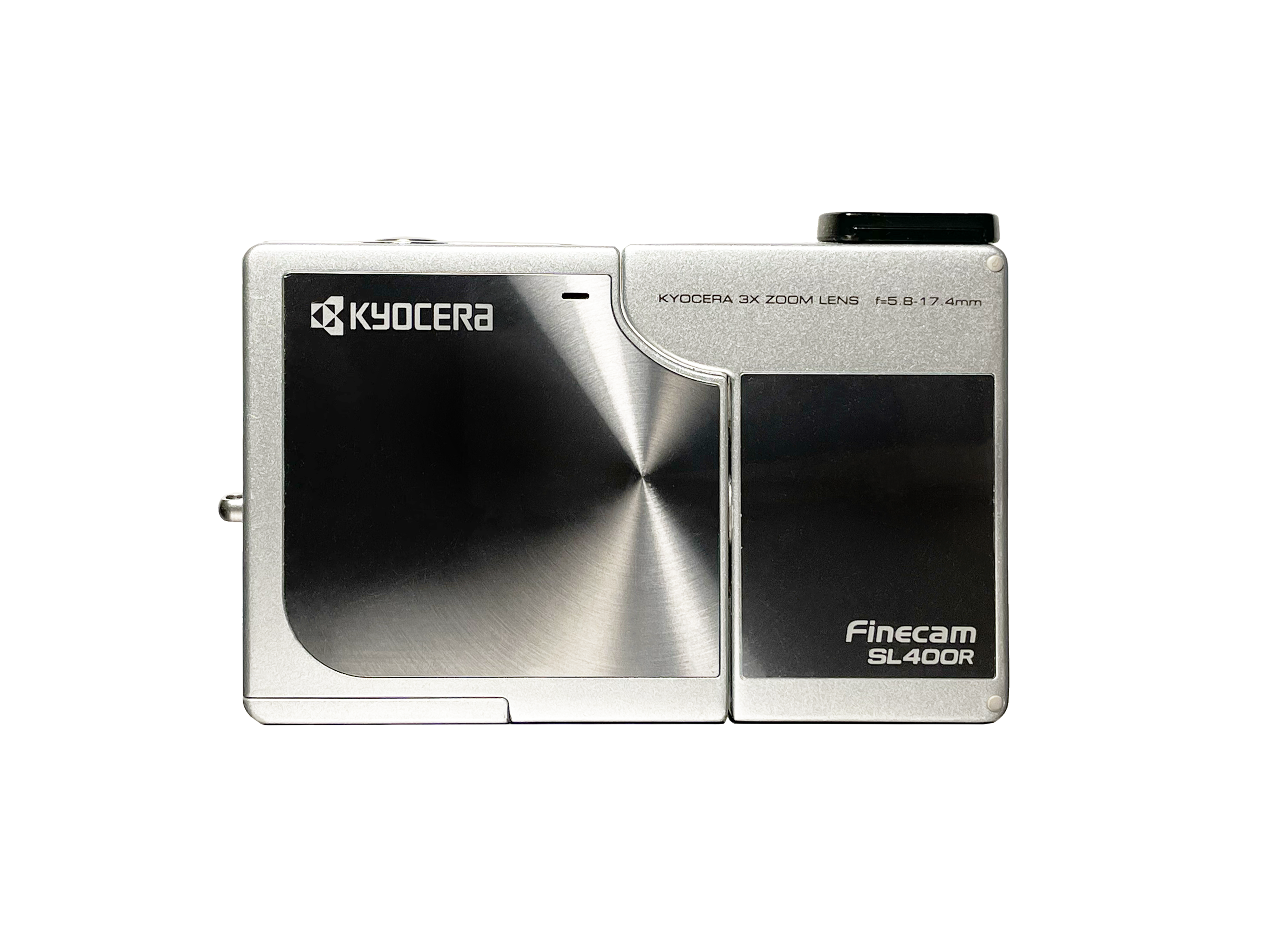
Kyocera Finecam SL400R, a compact digital camera announced in 2004

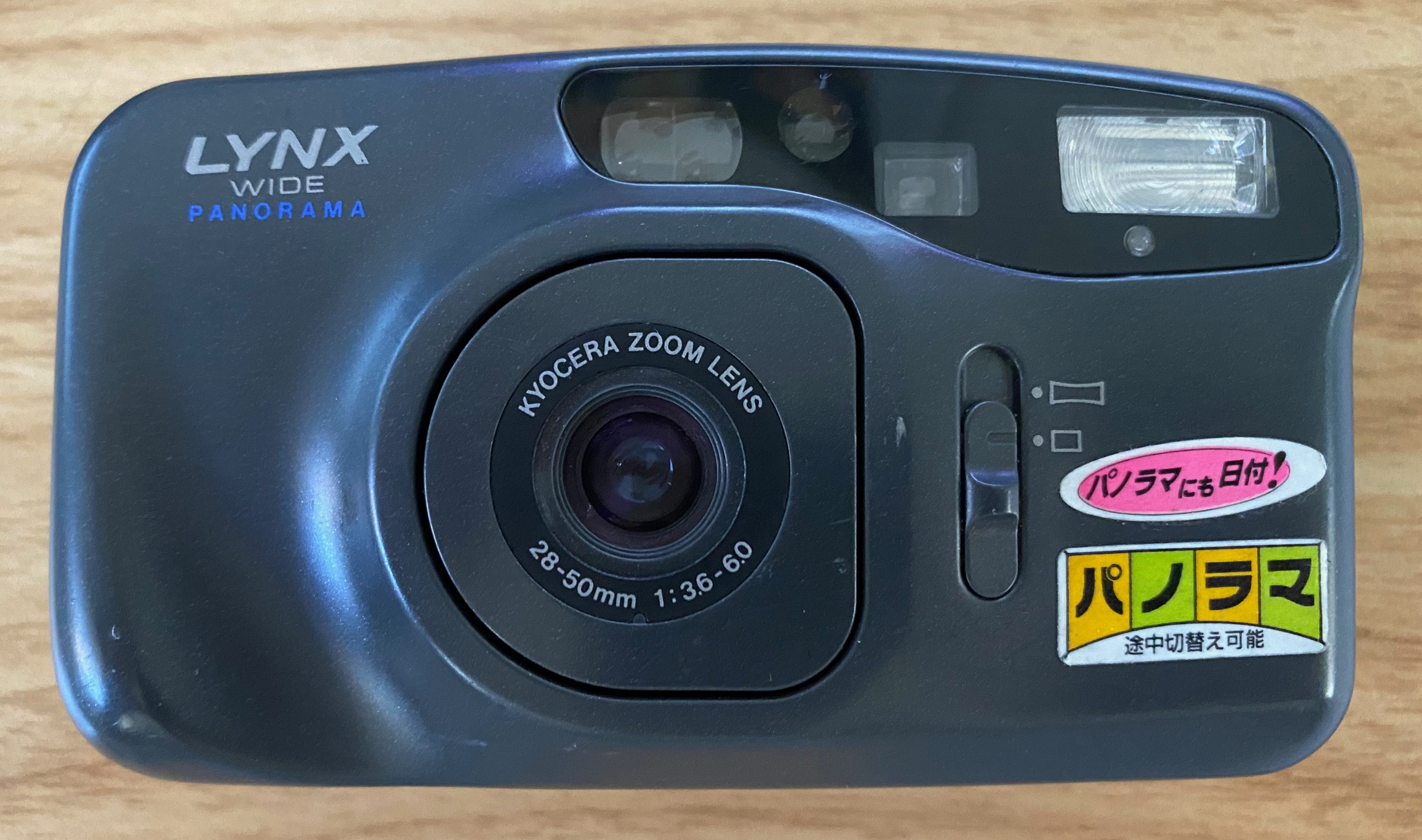
A Kyocera Lynx 35mm film camera

== See also ==
- Cybernet (brand)
- Kyoto Prize
- Taito
- List of digital camera brands
