= Kyocera Communications =

American subsidiary of Japanese mobile phone manufacturer Kyocera

Kyocera Communications, Inc.
- Company type: Subsidiary
- Industry: Telecommunication, Mobile phones
- Founded: April 1, 2008, formed by the merger of Kyocera Wireless, Kyocera International, and Sanyo Mobile Phone Division.
- Headquarters: San Diego, California, USA
- Key people: Yasuhiro Oishi- President; Jim Kelly- COO/EVP
- Products: Mobile Phones
- Parent: Kyocera Corporation
- Website: www.kyoceramobile.com

Kyocera Communications, Inc. (from Japanese: 京セラ Kyōsera) is an American manufacturer of mobile phones for wireless service providers in the United States and Canada. Kyocera Communications, Inc. is a wholly owned subsidiary of Kyocera Corporation, which also manufactures mobile phones for the Japanese wireless market under various brands.

== History ==
KWC was originally formed in February 2000 when Kyocera acquired Qualcomm's San Diego, California-based terrestrial handset division. Upon the purchase of Qualcomm's business unit, Kyocera formed Kyocera Wireless Corp. (KWC).

In 2003, Kyocera Wireless India (KWI), based in Bangalore, was established as a fully owned subsidiary of KWC, expanding KWC's reach into India's CDMA markets. However, in September 2009, KWC sold KWI to Mindtree Ltd. of Bangalore, India.

In 2008, Kyocera Corp. acquired the mobile phone division of Sanyo Electric Co., Ltd. for $375 million, making it the world's sixth-largest cell phone company. On April 1, 2008, it took the North American assets of Sanyo and created Kyocera Sanyo Telecom, Inc. (KSTI). It also announced that it was entering the GSM handset market, with a focus on the Latin American market. Kyocera continued selling Sanyo-branded phones throughout 2010.

On April 1, 2009, Kyocera announced the integration of KWC and KSTI, creating a new, consolidated division called Kyocera Communications, Inc. (KCI), with the headquarters remaining in its San Diego location. KCI remains one of North America's larger handset manufacturers, providing products to multiple wireless carriers including Cingular Wireless, AT&T, Boost Mobile, Cricket Wireless, MetroPCS, Public Mobile, Sprint Corporation, T-Mobile US, U.S. Cellular, Verizon Wireless, and Virgin Mobile USA.

In October 2011, Sprint began offering Kyocera's Dura Series, an exclusive line of rugged phones manufactured by Kyocera Communications using Sprint's new CDMA-based Push to talk service Sprint Direct Connect.

In August 2014, Kyocera released the Kyocera Brigadier, the first U.S. smartphone to be equipped with a display made of sapphire glass. This technology was carried over to the Verizon-distributed versions of the Duraforce Pro (announced August 2016, South Korea name Kyocera Torque) and the Duraforce Pro 2 (announced November 2018).

In 2022, Kyocera developed transmissive metasurface technology; a technology to improve performance and coverage area for 5G networks.

In April 2023, Kyocera acquired 37 acres of land in Isahaya City, Nagasaki Prefecture. The land was acquired to build a new smart factory that will produce ceramic components used in semiconductor applications and packages.
