= Lensbaby =

Line of camera lenses

Lensbaby LLC
- Type: Private
- Industry: Imaging
- Founded: Portland, Oregon, U.S. (2004)
- Founder: Craig Strong; Sam Pardue
- Headquarters: Portland, Oregon, U.S.
- Area served: United States; 35 + Countries
- Key people: Craig Strong (CCO); Greg Sharp (GM)
- Products: DSLR lenses, Mirrorless lenses, optics
- Number of employees: 40 (Aug 3, 2012)
- Website: lensbaby.com

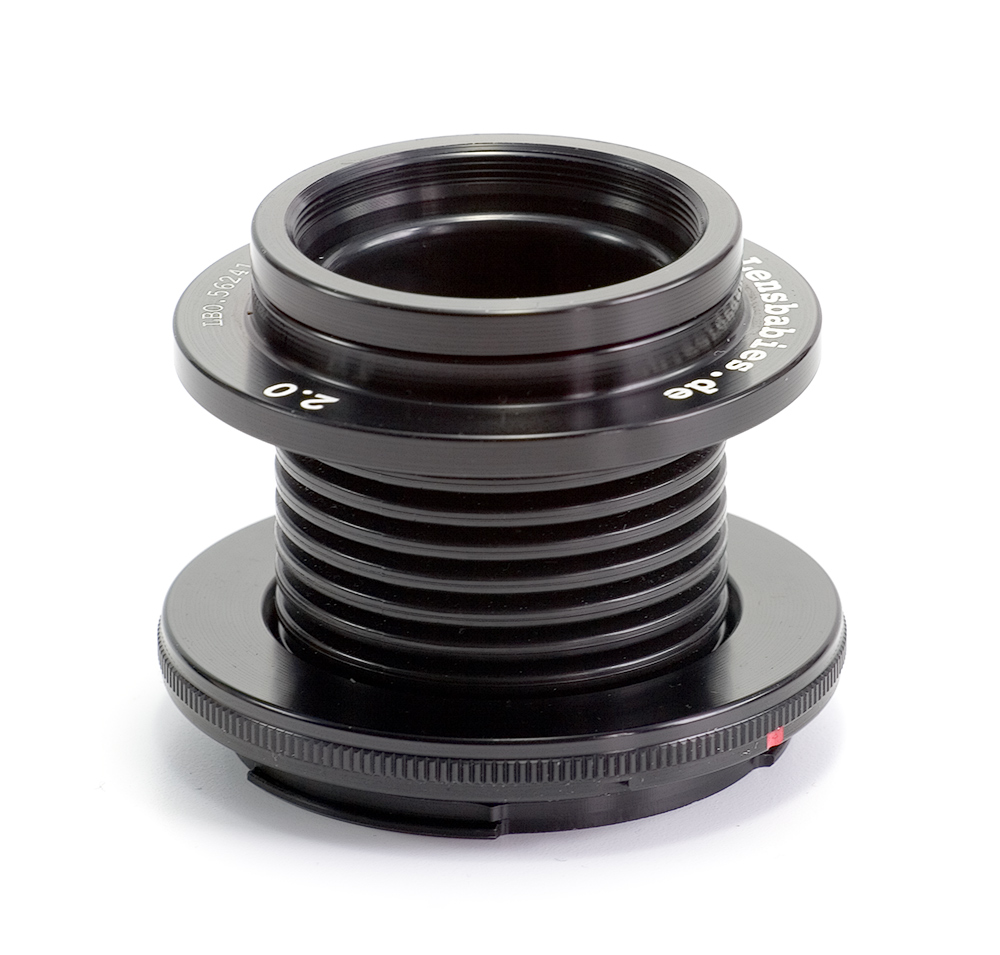
The Lensbaby 2.0

Lensbaby is a line of camera lenses for DSLR and mirrorless cameras that combines a simple lens with a bellows/ball and socket mechanism for use in special effect photography. A Lensbaby can give effects normally associated with view cameras. The lenses are for use in selective focus photography and bokeh effects.

== Overview ==
Image created with a Lensbaby selective focus lens.

Lensbaby lenses can be used with most cameras that accept interchangeable lenses, mainly DSLR, SLR, mirrorless, 35mm film and PL mount motion cameras.

The focus front standard can be manipulated off axis to move the sharpest area of focus (called the "sweet spot") to almost anywhere in the frame. This allows the important part of the subject to be rendered fairly sharp with everything else out of focus, even if it is the same distance from the camera. The Lensbaby naturally focuses at approximately 2 feet; closer focus is achieved by pushing the front of the lens out, and infinity focus is achieved by pulling the front of the lens toward the base of the lens. There is extreme spherical and some chromatic aberration outside the central "sweet spot". Lensbaby lenses have no electronic components, disabling auto-focus when mounted on modern cameras. The use of auto-focus is further undermined by the spherical aberration in the lens. In most cases, Lensbaby lenses require aperture priority or fully manual mode. The Lensbaby can also be used for infrared photography, but does not include an index mark for infrared photography.

== History ==
Craig Strong, a professional photographer from Portland, Oregon, invented the first Lensbaby lens by combining a vacuum cleaner hose body and a large format speed graphic lens. Strong redesigned the original prototype. He then partnered with entrepreneur Sam Pardue to form Lensbabies, LLC. The Original Lensbaby was launched in 2004 at the WPPI tradeshow. Images taken with the Original Lensbaby featured a 'sweet spot' of sharp focus surrounded by directional blur. This effect was achieved through the use of a single element lens. The Original Lensbaby used interchangeable drop-in apertures held in by a rubber o-ring.

In 2005, Lensbaby released the Lensbaby 2.0, an upgrade to the Original Lensbaby which featured a sharper, brighter optic, creating greater contrast between areas of blur and sharpness. The Lensbaby 2.0 used interchangeable aperture disks that levitated in front of the optic using magnets.

In 2006 Lensbaby introduced the Lensbaby 3G, which used a threaded rod system in combination with a locking mechanism to allow the flexible lens body to be locked into place for repeatable results.

In 2007, the Lensbaby 3GPL was launched, allowing cinematographers to use Lensbaby lenses on motion picture cameras.

Lensbaby fixed bellows lenses
Spec Optic	FL (mm)	Aperture		Construc.		Filter (mm)	Effect	Notes / Refs.
Spec Optic	FL (mm)	Range	Type (Note: Type of aperture control: (Waterhouse stop or Iris diaphragm))	Ele	Grp	Filter (mm)	Effect	Notes / Refs.
Original	50	f/2.8–8	W	1	1	—N/a	sweet spot	EF, NF, PK, A/α
Original	65	f/3.3–10	W	1	1	—N/a	sweet spot	R, OM, FD, SR, C/Y, M42
Original	45	f/2.5–6.7	W	1	1	—N/a	sweet spot	4/3
2.0	50	f/2–8	W	2	1	—N/a	sweet spot	
3G	50	f/2–22	W	2	1	—N/a	sweet spot	

=== Optic Swap System ===
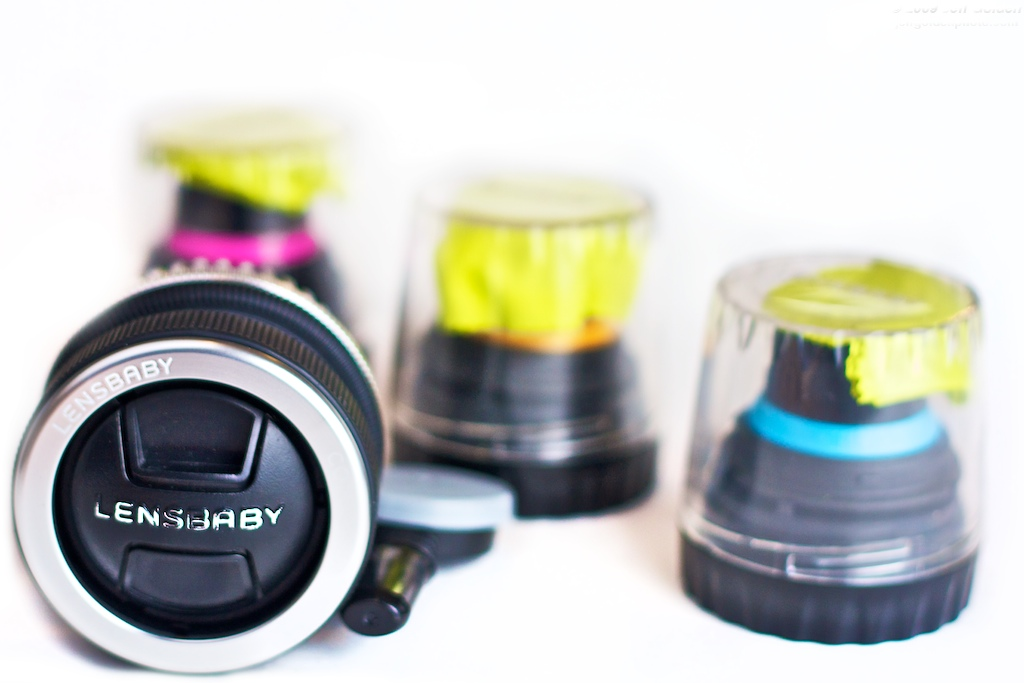
Lensbaby Composer (front) with three Optics in plastic storage cases; L-R: Pinhole / Zone Plate (pink), Single Glass (yellow), Plastic (blue)

In 2008, Lensbabies was renamed to Lensbaby and released the Optic Swap System, a modular design that included three lens bodies, the Composer, Muse and Control Freak; each lens body accepted one of four (at the time of release) interchangeable optics. The Muse featured flexible bellows and was similar in design to the Lensbaby 2.0. The Control Freak was an update on the Lensbaby 3G. The Composer introduced a new ball and socket design, which allowed the user to swivel the lens to move the sweet spot, along with a focusing helicoid.

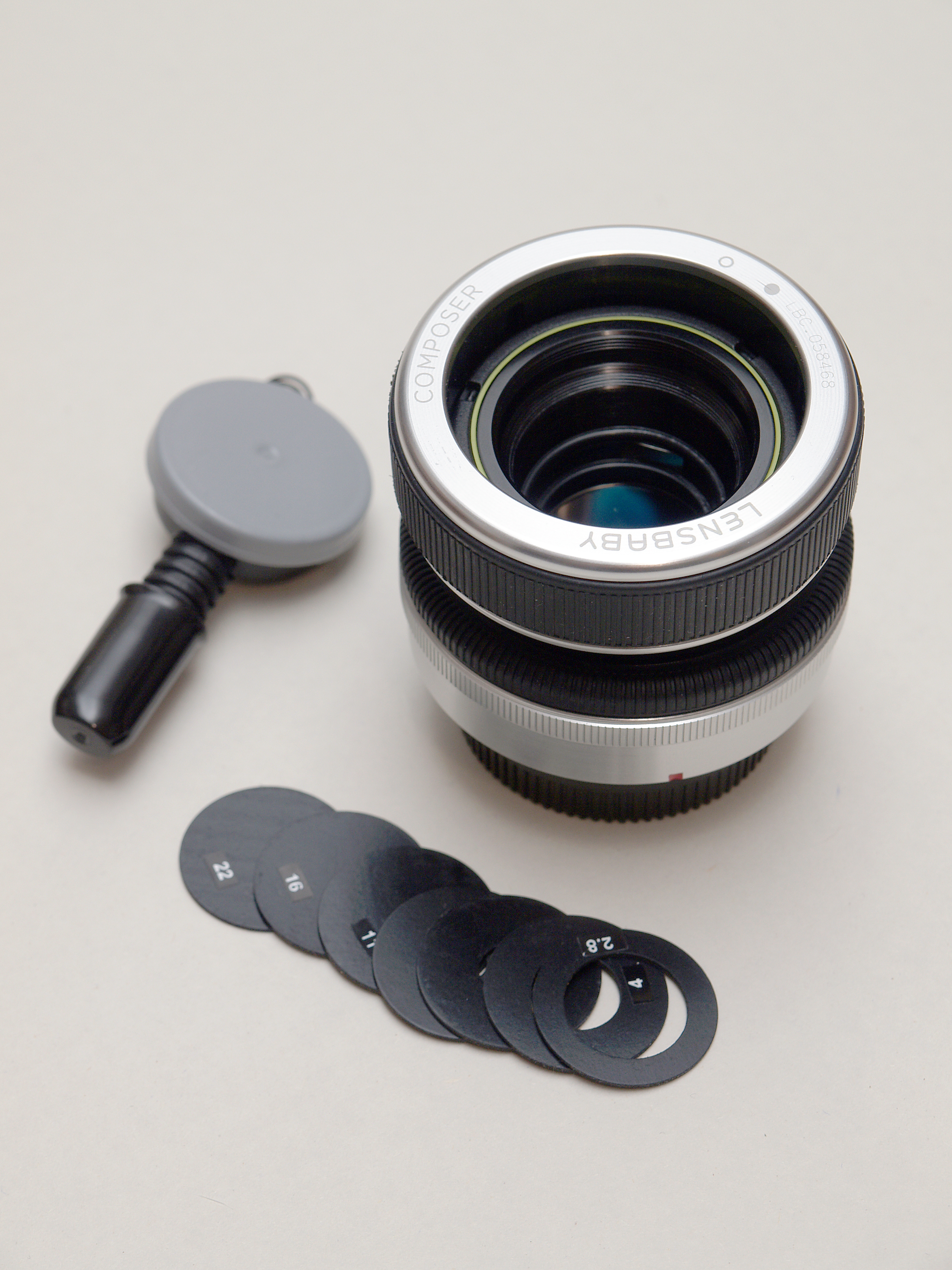
Lensbaby Composer with Double Glass Optic (green ring) and drop-in Waterhouse stops

Concurrently, four interchangeable optics were released with the three lens bodies: Double Glass, Single Glass, Plastic, and Pinhole / Zone Plate. The Double Glass is the multicoated glass doublet from the Lensbaby 2.0 and 3G. The Single Glass is based on the single, uncoated glass lens from the Original Lensbaby, but faster. The Plastic is a single plastic lens designed to be reminiscent of Holga and Diana cameras. All three lenses have a focal length of 50 mm. The Pinhole / Zone Plate can be toggled between a f/177 pinhole and f/19 zone plate.

In 2009, Lensbaby released two more optics: Soft Focus and Fisheye.

In 2010, Scout, the first "straight" Lensbaby lens body which could not be tilted, was released. It included the 12mm Fisheye optic. The Composer with Tilt Transformer also was released in 2010. The Tilt Transformer was an adapter that allowed Micro 4/3 and Sony NEX cameras to use lenses with Nikon F mount, combined with a ball-and-socket joint to enable traditional Lensbaby tilting effects, while the combined Composer with Tilt Transformer included a focusing helicoid that mounted on the Tilt Transformer and accepted Optic Swap System lenses with a 37 mm filter. The Composer with Tilt Transformer shipped with an additional, front-mounted optic adapter which changed the focal length by 0.8× to 40 mm and allowed the system to focus to infinity.

In 2011, Composer Pro, an upgraded version of the Composer, was released. Composer Pro was sold with the Sweet 35 optic, a "sweet spot" selective focus optic. Sweet 35 was the first Lensbaby optic to feature internal apertures. It was followed in 2012 by another optic with internal apertures, the Edge 80 optic. The Edge 80 optic produced a slice of sharp focus surrounded by smooth blur, similar to the effect created by a tilt-shift lens. For the entry-level market, Lensbaby introduced the all-plastic Spark in 2012; it has features similar to the Muse, bundled with a fixed-aperture glass doublet f/5.6 lens, and is compatible with other optics.

Despite the introduction of standalone lenses in 2014 and 2015, Lensbaby has continued to update the modular Optic Swap System. In 2015, Lensbaby released the Composer Pro II with a metal body and the Edge 50 optic, with features similar to the Edge 80 but with a shorter focal length. The Twist 60 was announced in 2016, featuring Petzval-like "swirly" bokeh.

The Sweet 80 and Creative Bokeh optics were released in 2017. The Edge 35, another "edge" optic with a sharp focus slice, was added in 2019.

In 2020, Lensbaby released the Spark 2.0, an updated lens body for the Optic Swap System similar to the Muse and original Lensbaby. Two updated optics followed in 2021 (Obscura 50) and 2022 (Soft Focus II). Obscura 50 has selectable pinhole (f/161), zone plate (f/32), and pinhole sieve (f/64) openings equivalent to a focal length of 50 mm. Soft Focus II takes the same magnetic aperture discs as the original Soft Focus, but combines that with an internal iris diaphragm. The Double Glass II (2023) features similar upgrades, adding an internal diaphragm and changing the body to metal.

=== Standalone lenses ===
In a departure from its previous mount-plus-optic modular system, in 2014 Lensbaby introduced the Circular Fisheye lens, which was a complete, stand-alone lens in a single unit. In addition, Lensbaby also introduced the LM-10 that year, a "sweet spot" lens attachment for smartphones, funded through the Kickstarter crowdsourcing platform. The LM-10 was later sold in a bundle with LM-20 (larger sweet spot) and LM-30 (multi-image filter) attachments.

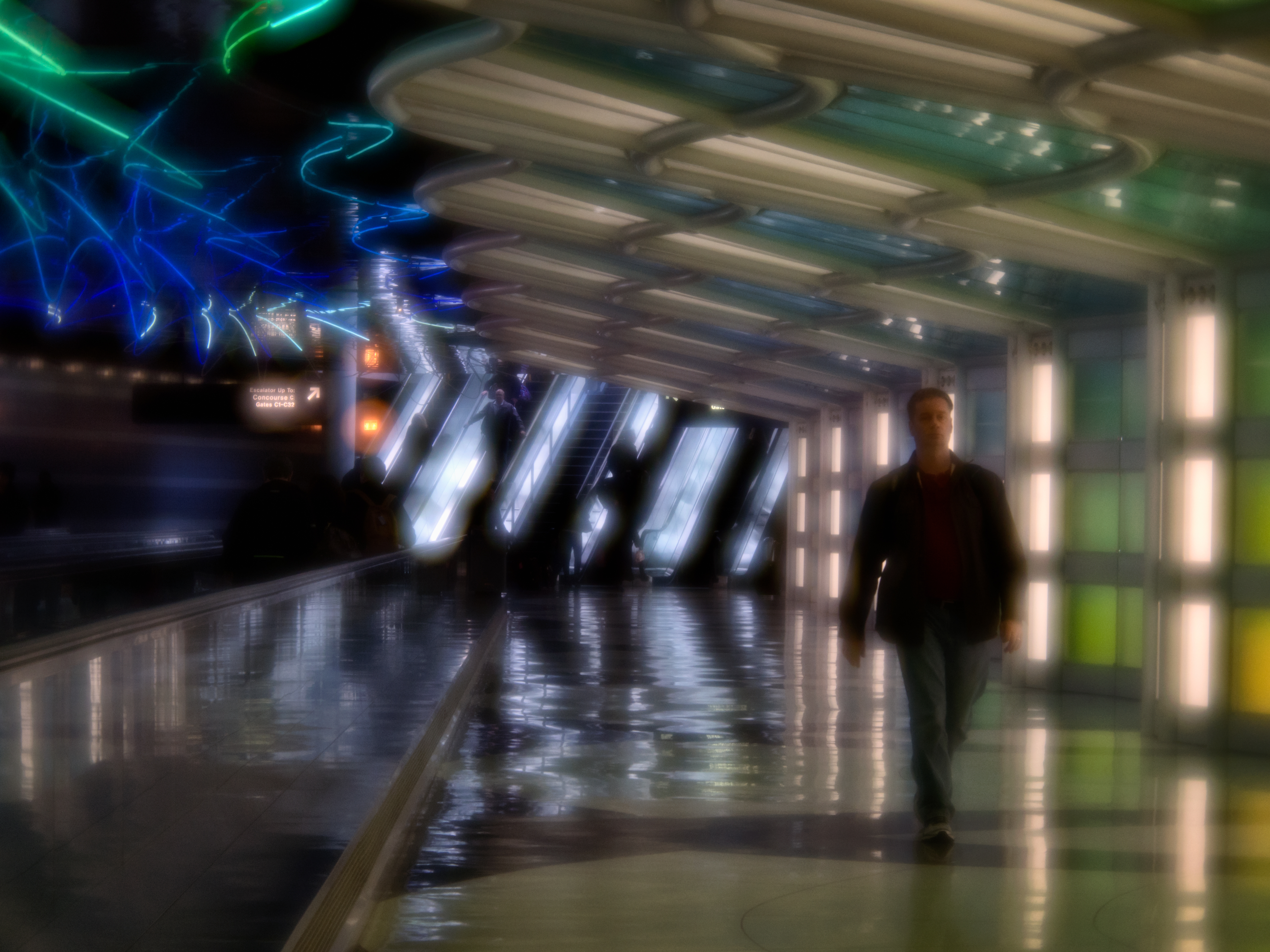
Photograph taken at Chicago O'Hare International Airport with Velvet 56, demonstrating soft focus effect

In 2015 Lensbaby introduced another complete lens, the Velvet 56, a 56mm lens capable of 1:1 macro. This lens featured a singlet-doublet-singlet optical design the company claimed evoked the optical imperfections of lenses manufactured in the mid-1900s. By intentional incorporation of spherical aberration, the lens also provides a soft focus effect, more at larger apertures and less as the lens is closed down.

As a hybrid between the fully modular Optic Swap System and the standalone line, Lensbaby introduced the Trio 28 in 2016, which featured a non-interchangeable turret that could be switched between one of three 28 mm lenses, each with a different effect (Sweet, Velvet, and Twist).

The Velvet 85 was launched in 2017, featuring the same "velvet" soft focus effects as the Velvet 56 in a classic portrait focal length. A standalone Velvet 28 followed in 2020.

In 2018, Lensbaby announced the Burnside 35, a wide-angle lens using a Petzval design and a secondary aperture to control vignetting and special effects, and the Sol 45, a "more restrained package" with features similar to the Composer Pro and a centering lock to eliminate tilt. The Sol 22 followed in 2019, with features similar to the Sol 45 but with a reduced focal length of 22 mm, exclusively for Micro Four Thirds system cameras.

A standalone Obscura 16 lens was launched for mirrorless cameras in 2020, simultaneously with the Obscura 50 Optic. Like the Obscura 50, the Obscura 16 includes selectable pinhole (f/90), zone plate (f/22), and pinhole sieve (f/45), at an equivalent focal length of 16 mm. In 2024, Lensbaby added the Sweet 22, its widest lens to date.

== Products ==
=== Lens bodies ===
Lensbaby lenses mount directly onto SLR or mirrorless camera bodies. They have interchangeable drop in optics. Currently the lineup of lenses come with an optic installed.

Lensbaby Optic Swap System bodies
Spec Body	Focus	Tilt		Dimensions		Min. focus w/ 50mm optic	Refs.
Spec Body	Focus	Tilt	Release date	H×W	Wgt	Min. focus w/ 50mm optic	Refs.
Composer	Barrel	Ball and socket, ±17°	2008	2 1/4×2 1/2 in (5.7×6.4 cm)	3.7 oz (100 g)	18 in (0.5 m)	
Composer with Tilt Transformer	Barrel (removable)	Ball and socket	September 2010	2.4×2.5 in (6.1×6.4 cm)	4.69 oz (133 g)	12 in (0.3 m)	
Composer Pro	Barrel	Ball and socket, ±17.5°	2011	2 1/4×2 1/2 in (5.7×6.4 cm)	4 oz (110 g)	?	
Composer Pro II	Barrel	Ball and socket, ±15°	October 21, 2015	3 1/4×2 1/2 in (8.3×6.4 cm)	10 oz (280 g)	8 in (0.2 m)	with Edge 50
Control Freak	Threaded rods	Threaded rods	May 26, 2010	2 1/4×2 1/2 in (5.7×6.4 cm)	3.7 oz (100 g)	12 in (0.3 m)	
Muse	Squeeze	Squeeze	January 1, 2008	2 1/4×2 1/2 in (5.7×6.4 cm)	3.7 oz (100 g)	12 in (0.3 m)	
Scout	Barrel	—N/a	October 12, 2010	2.28×2.61 in (5.8×6.6 cm)	8 oz (230 g)	?	
Spark	Squeeze	Squeeze	September 18, 2012	2×2 1/2 in (5.1×6.4 cm)	?	13 in (0.3 m)	
Spark 2.0	Squeeze	Squeeze	October 28, 2020	2×2.5 in (5.1×6.4 cm)	6.5 oz (180 g)	15 in (0.4 m)	

Composer Pro
The Composer Pro lensbody operates on a ball and socket and allows photographers to use selective focus on a tilted plane. This lens body comes with either a 50mm multi-coated optical glass doublet with drop in aperture, 35mm 4 multi-coated glass optic with 12-blade adjustable aperture or with Edge 80 Optic with 80mm focal length.

Spark

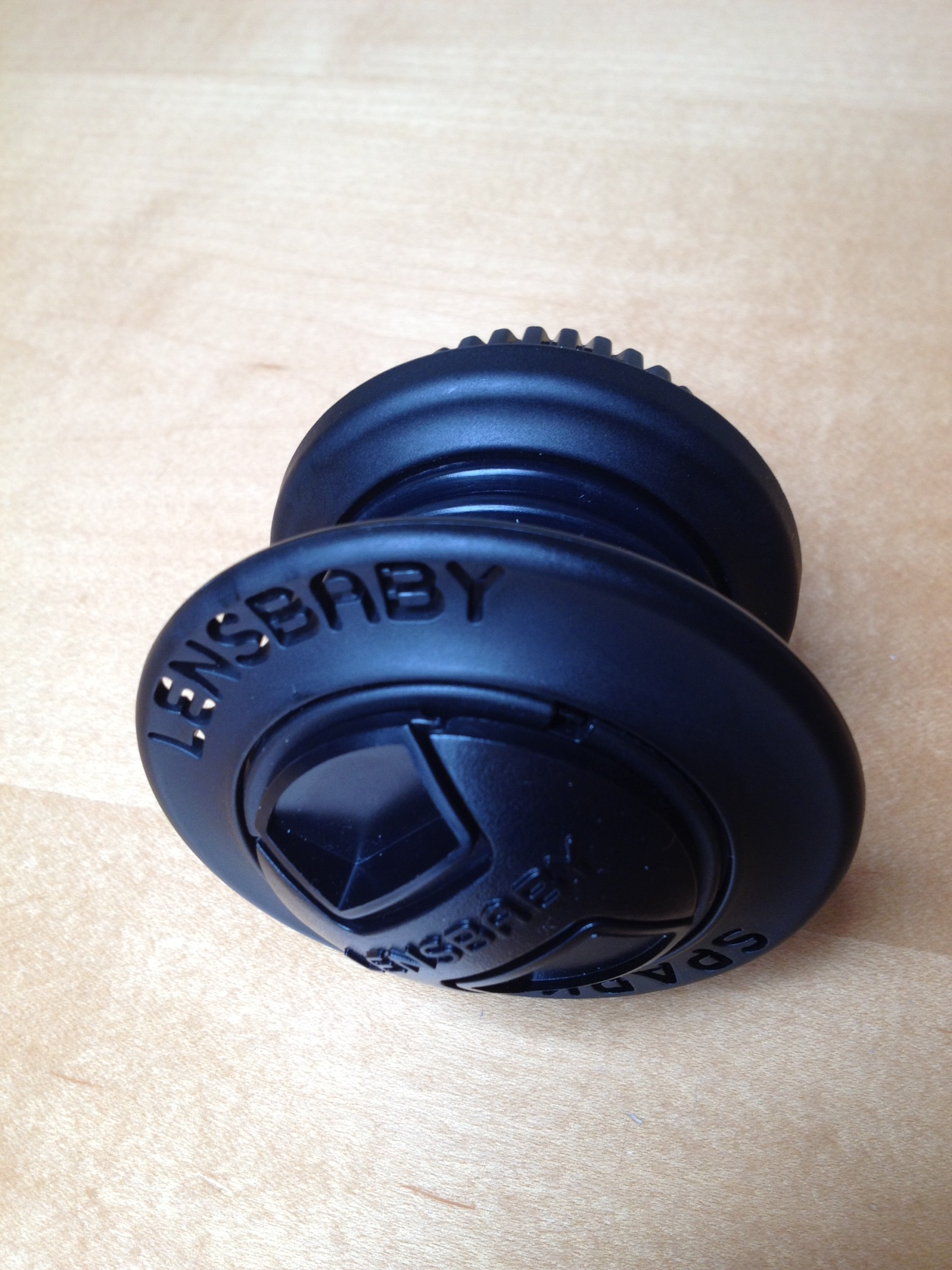
Lensbaby Spark

The Spark is the newest iteration of the Original Lensbaby. It contains a fixed 5.6 aperture optic and uses selective focus to create a center of focus surrounded by gradually increasing blur. It comes in either a Canon EF or Nikon F mount.

Muse
The Muse has a design similar to the Original Lensbaby and the 2.0. Its simple design consists of an interchangeable optic attached to a flexible tube bellows. The user both focuses and moves the area in focus by squeezing and bending the lens. It does not hold position and requires the photographer to maintain the focus manually. The Muse is available with a multi-coated glass optical doublet installed, and comes with f/2.8, f/4, f/5.6, and f/8 aperture disks. It is compatible with 35mm cameras and PL mount.

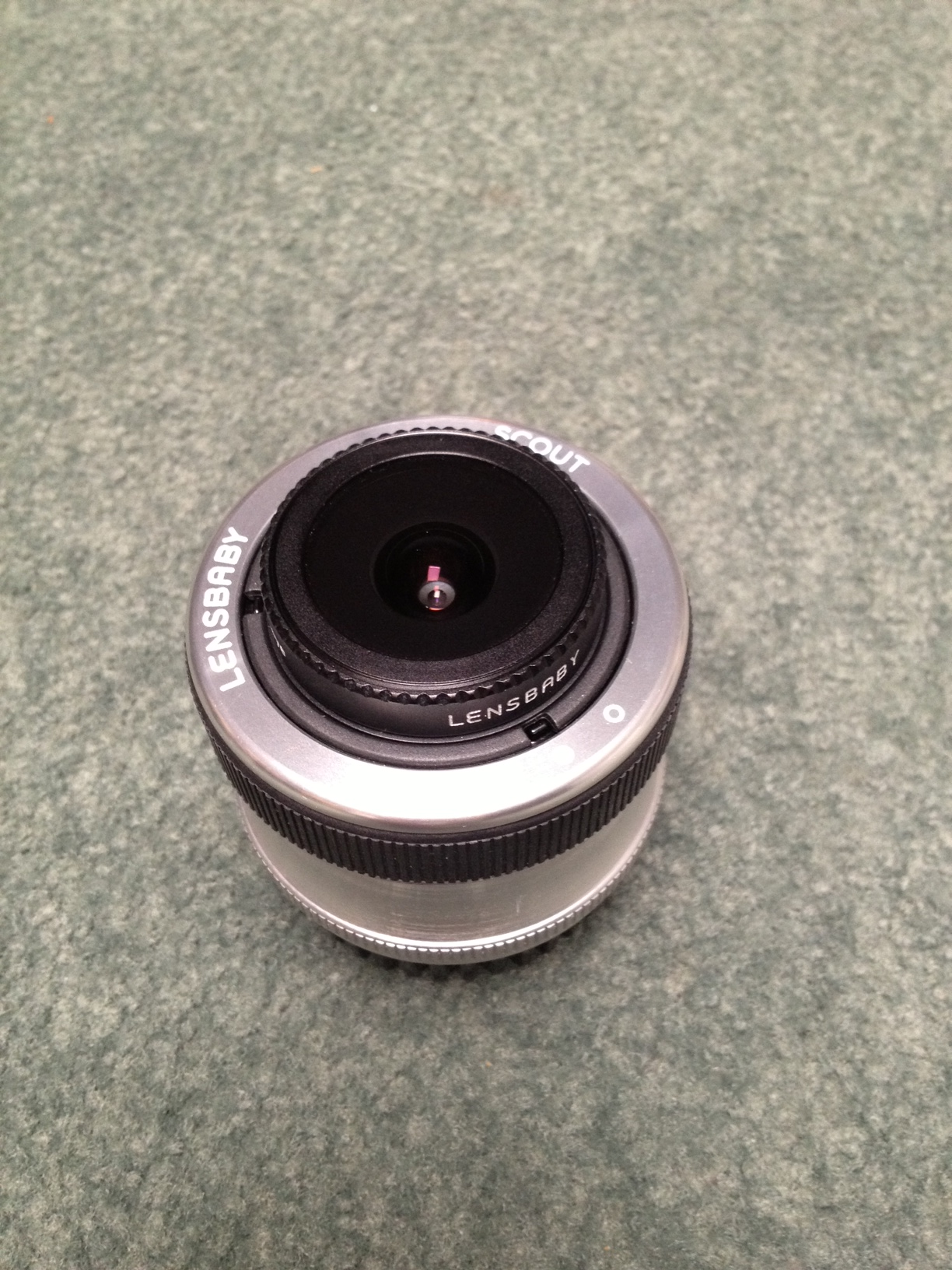
Lensbaby Scout installed with Fisheye Optic

Scout
The Scout does not have selective focus control and is intended for use as a traditional fisheye lens with a very close minimum focus distance.

=== Optic Swap ===
Lensbaby produces several different interchangeable drop in optics. Each optic has a varied effect, ranging from a sharp slice of focus, soft focus to pinhole photography.

Lensbaby Optic Swap System lenses
Spec Optic	FL (mm)	Aperture		Construc.		Filter (mm)	Effect	Refs.
Spec Optic	FL (mm)	Range	Type	Ele	Grp	Filter (mm)	Effect	Refs.
Fisheye	12	f/4–22	W	6	?	—N/a	fisheye	
Edge 35	35	f/3.5–22	I	9	6	46	tilt-shift	
Sweet 35	35	f/2.5–22	I	4	3	46	sweet spot of focus	
Double Glass	50	f/2–22	W	2	1	37	sweet spot of focus	
Double Glass II	50	f/2.5–22	W, I	2	1	46	sweet spot of focus	
Edge 50	50	f/3.5–22	I	8	6	46	tilt-shift	
Obscura	50	f/32 (ZP) f/64 (PS) f/161 (PH)	—N/a	—N/a	—N/a	37 & 46	pinhole, zone plate	
Pinhole/ Zone Plate	50	f/177 (PH) f/19 (ZP)	—N/a	—N/a	—N/a	37	pinhole, zone plate	
Plastic	50	f/2–22	W	1	1	37	toy camera	
Single Glass	50	f/2–22	W	1	1	37	antique camera	
Soft Focus	50	f/2–22	W	2	1	37	soft focus	
Soft Focus II	50	f/2.5–22	W, I	2	1	46	soft focus	
Spark	50	f/5.6	—N/a	2	1	37	sweet spot, fixed aperture	
Spark 2.0	50	f/2.5	—N/a	2	1	46	sweet spot, fixed aperture	
Sweet 50	50	f/2.5–22	I	2	1	46	sweet spot of focus	
Twist 60	60	f/2.5–22	I	4	3	46	Petzval / swirl bokeh	
Edge 80	80	f/2.8–22	I	5	4	46	tilt-shift	
Sweet 80	80	f/2.8–16	I	4	2	46	sweet spot of focus	

Edge 80
The Edge 80 is an 80mm drop-in optic with adjustable aperture. Its aperture ranges from f/2.8-f/22 and it has a flat field of focus. The minimum focusing distance of this optic is approximately 17 inches when the optic is extended forward and fully tilted. Its maximum focusing distance is infinity. The Lensbaby Macro Converters screw on in between the optic and lens, it is incompatible with current 37mm Lensbaby accessories.

Sweet 35
The Sweet 35 is a 35mm drop in optic with adjustable aperture. Its aperture ranges from f/2.5−f/22 with a selective spot of focus. It focuses approximately 7.5" to infinity from the front of the optic. The Lensbaby Macro Converters screw on in between the optic and lens, it is incompatible with current 37mm Lensbaby accessories.

Soft Focus
The Soft Focus is a 50mm drop in optic with swappable aperture disks that range from f/2 up to f/22.

Fisheye
The Fisheye is a 12mm drop in optic with swappable aperture disks that range from f/5.6 to f/22. This optic has a 160 degree of view and focuses from .5" from the front of the optic to infinity.

Double Glass
The Double Glass is a 50mm drop-in optic with magnetic swappable aperture disks. The lens glass is a low dispersion, high refractive index, multi-coated optical glass doublet.

Optic Kit
The Optic Kit contains three separate drop-in optics with four separate effects.

- Single Glass
- Plastic
- Pinhole/Zone Plate

=== Standalone lenses ===
In addition to its modular Optic Swap System line, Lensbaby has produced standalone, manual focus lenses since 2014 which include the optics, focusing mechanism, and mechanical lens mounts in a single, integrated unit. Many of these also are equipped with a manual iris diaphragm.

Lensbaby standalone lenses
Spec Lens	FL (mm)	Aperture	Construc.		Filter (mm)	Released	Effect	Refs.
Spec Lens	FL (mm)	Aperture	Ele	Grp	Filter (mm)	Released	Effect	Refs.
Circular Fisheye	5.8	f/3.5–22	8	5	—N/a	2014	fisheye, polished internal barrel	
Obscura 16	16	f/22 (ZP) f/45 (PS) f/90 (PH)	—N/a	—N/a	—N/a	2020	pinhole, zone plate	
Sol 22	22	f/3.5	3	2	46	2019	tilt, sweet spot	
Sweet 22	22	f/3.5	4	2	46	2024	sweet spot	
Trio 28	28	f/3.5	3	3	46	2016	Sweet (sweet spot)	
Trio 28	28	f/3.5	4	3	46	2016	Twist (swirl bokeh)	
Trio 28	28	f/3.5	3	2	46	2016	Velvet (soft focus)	
Twist 28	28	f/3.5	4	3	—N/a	2026	Twist (swirl bokeh)	
Velvet 28	28	f/2.5–22	8	7	67	2020	soft focus	
Sol 45	45	f/3.5	3	2	46	2018	tilt, sweet spot	
Burnside 35	35	f/2.8–16	6	4	62	2018	vignette, swirl bokeh	
Velvet 56	56	f/1.6–16	4	3	62	2015	soft focus	
Velvet 85	85	f/1.8–16	4	3	67	2017	soft focus	

=== Accessories ===
Lensbaby sells wide angle, telephoto and macro adapters that screw onto the 37mm threads. In March 2011, Lensbaby introduced seven optics that a user can swap into and out of any of the in-production Lensbaby lenses Among the new products was a plastic optic capable of producing the distortion and chromatic aberration familiar to Holga and LOMO users, a fisheye lens, a pinhole for infinite depth of field, zoneplate optic for very soft-focus effects, and an uncoated glass singlet.

Macro Converters
The Macro Converters are a set of two extension tubes which fit between the optic and the mechanical body. One tube is 8mm, and the other tube is 16mm; they may be stacked together to make a 24mm tube. Depending on the optic, the 8mm converter allows a user to focus from 0"-8.13" while the 16mm lets a user focus from 2.25"-6", when stacked they become a 24mm converter which allows a user to focus from 1.63" to 5".

Macro distance chart
Maximum close-focus distance Optic	No attachments	w/ Macro Converter(s) (Note: Measured from front of the optic to subject in photo)			w/ Macro Converter(s) and Macro Kit Lenses (Note: Measured from front of macro lens to subject in photo)		
Maximum close-focus distance Optic	No attachments	+8mm	+16mm	8&16 (+24mm)	+8mm	+16mm	8&16 (+24mm)
Double Glass	18 in (460 mm)	8.13 in (207 mm)	6 in (150 mm)	5 in (130 mm)	1.9 in (48 mm)	1.7 in (43 mm)	1.5 in (38 mm)
Sweet 35	7.5 in (190 mm)	3.25 in (83 mm)	2.25 in (57 mm)	1.63 in (41 mm)	—N/a		
Edge 80	17 in (430 mm)	13.25 in (337 mm)	10.62 in (270 mm)	9 in (230 mm)	—N/a		
Fisheye	0.5 in (13 mm)	0 in (0 mm)	—N/a		—N/a		
Soft Focus	18 in (460 mm)	6.13 in (156 mm)	4.38 in (111 mm)	3.5 in (89 mm)	1.7 in (43 mm)	1.5 in (38 mm)	1.2 in (30 mm)
Single Glass	18 in (460 mm)	7.63 in (194 mm)	5.5 in (140 mm)	4.5 in (110 mm)	1.8 in (46 mm)	1.6 in (41 mm)	1.3 in (33 mm)
Plastic	18 in (460 mm)	5.5 in (140 mm)	4.38 in (111 mm)	3.5 in (89 mm)	1.6 in (41 mm)	1.4 in (36 mm)	1.2 in (30 mm)

Notes

Accessory Kit
The Lensbaby Accessory Kit contains four accessories that at one point were sold separately but now (with the exception of the Creative Aperture Kit) are limited to purchase in a kit.

- Macro Lenses
  - +4 lens
  - +10 lens
- 0.46x Wide Angle Converter
- 1.6 Telephoto Converter
- Creative Aperture Kit

Each item in the kit is compatible with all Lensbaby optics except for the Sweet 35, Edge 80, Spark and Pinhole/Zone Plate.

Creative Aperture Kit
The Creative Aperture Kit are disks that drop into Lensbaby's all non-adjustable aperture optics. The kit is sold as either pre-cut shapes (birds, diamonds, heart, dripsplat, slots, star, swirly, sunburst, whirlpool) or blanks.

0.42x Super Wide Angle
The 0.42x Super Wide Angle converter screws onto the 37mm threads of most Lensbaby optics except for the Sweet 35, Edge 80, Spark and Pinhole/Zone Plate. The converter also has 52mm threads for 52mm filters and step up rings.

Step Up/Shade
The Step Up/Shade was created to fill the gap of Lensbaby lenses incompatibility with standard step-up rings. This Step Up/Shade is 37-52mm and will fit on any of Lensbaby's 37mm threaded optics and allows for any 52mm filter to be screwed onto the front of the Step Up/Shade.

=== Discontinued products ===
Original Lensbaby

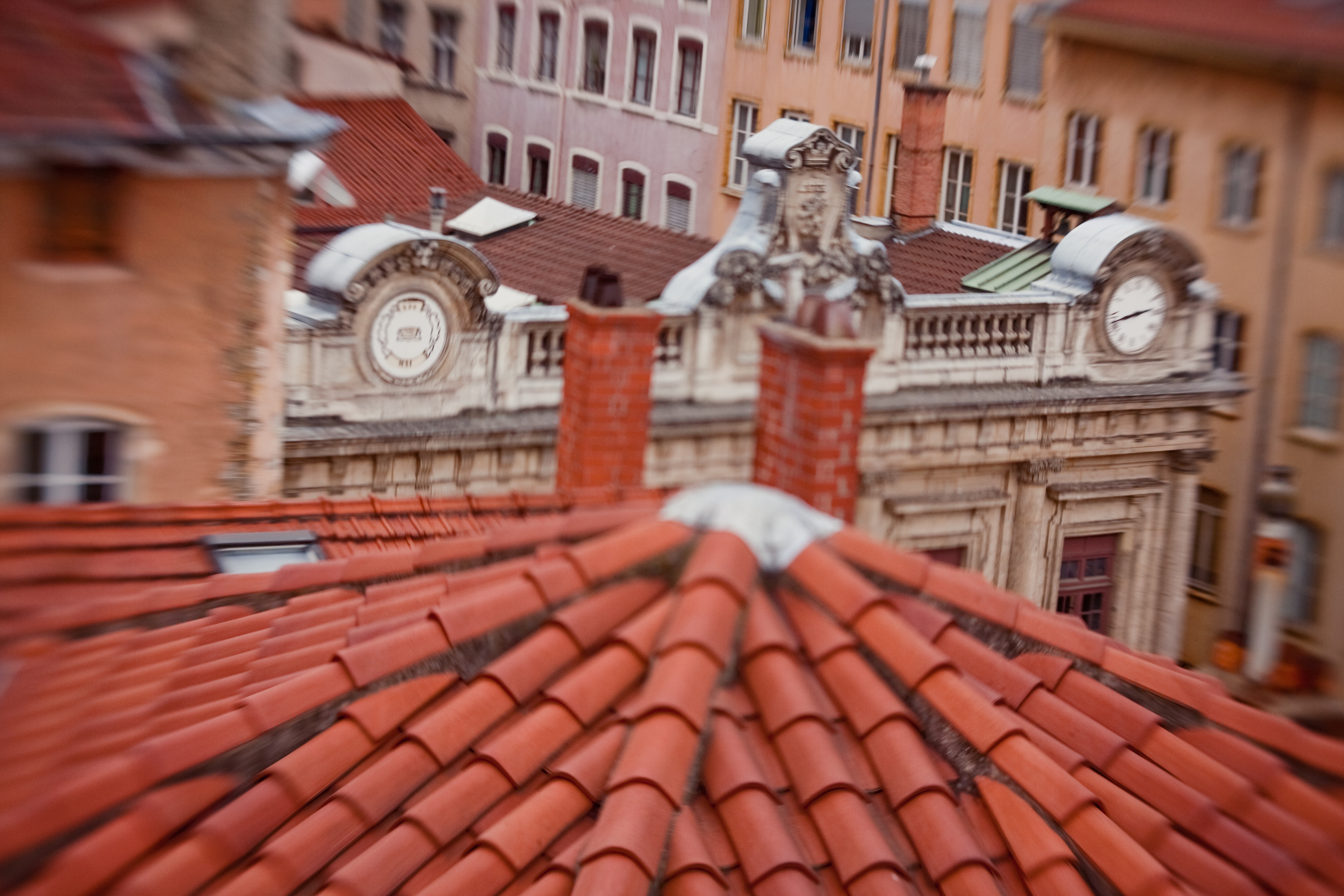
The loge du Change in Lyon taken from a rooftop with an original lensbaby

The Original Lensbaby released in 2004 is a flexible camera lens that creates an image that has an area of sharp focus surrounded by graduated blur. The lens is the initial springboard for the products to follow, the initial principal of shifting in the in-focus area by bending the flexible lens tube in any direction.

Specs of the Original Lensbaby

- 50mm focal length
- Manual Focus
- Fixed optical glass element
- Drop in aperture (f2.8, f/4, f/5.6, f/8)
- 7" Minimum focusing distance
- 2.25x2.5, 3.5oz

2.0

The 2.0 is the second generation of Lensbaby lenses, it improved on the initial design of the Original Lensbaby by adding additional apertures and improvement in the optical glass doublet.

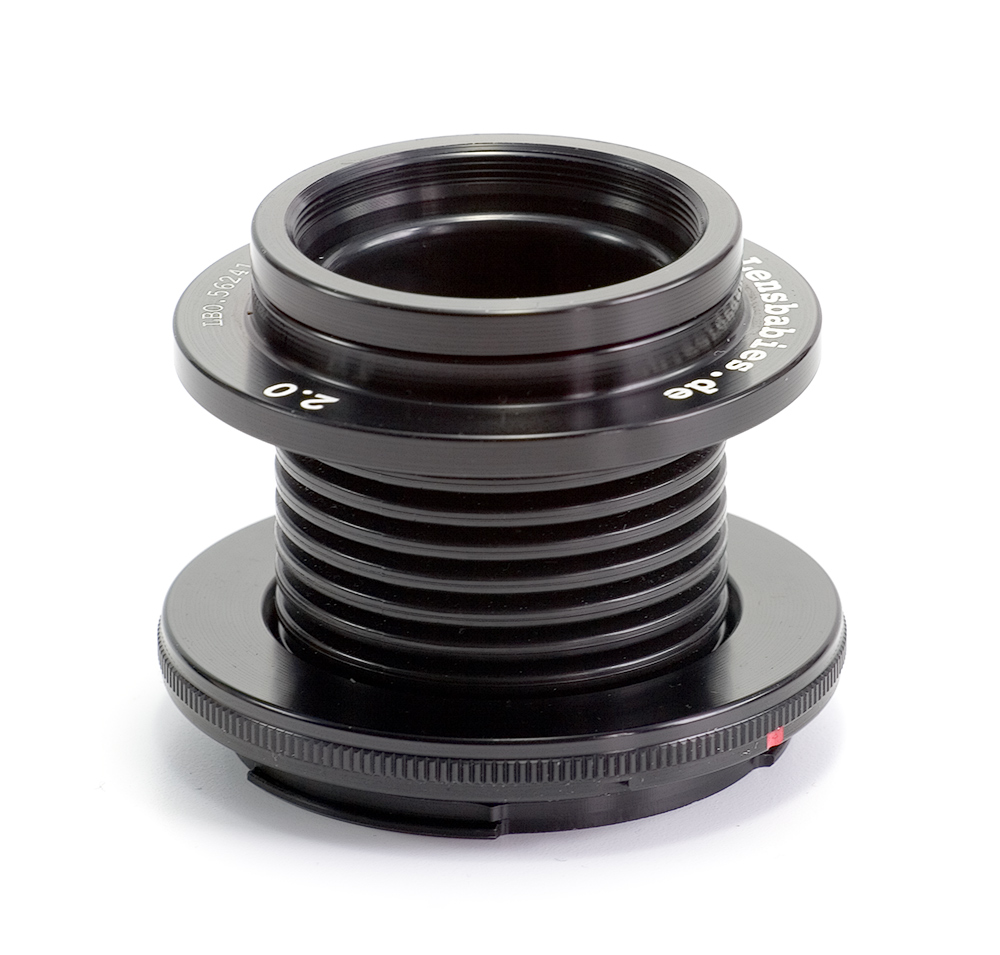
The Lensbaby 2.0

'Specs of the 2.0'

- Coated, high refractive index, low dispersion optical glass doublet
- 50mm focal length
- Manual focus
- drop in aperture (f/2-f.8)
- 10" minimum focusing distance
- 2.25" x 2.5", 3.6oz

3G
The 3G is a third generation selective focus SLR lens from Lensbaby. It is an upgraded version of the 2.0 with additions of three focusing rails that emerge from the camera mount and pass through the focusing collar. There is a trigger button on the focusing collar that releases three pins that engage the focusing rails and lock the 3G in a bent position. Once the lens is locked in place, additional fine focus can be achieved by turning the barrel focusing ring which moves the optic in and out like a normal manual focus lens. While the lens is locked the three focusing rails can be adjusted to move the sweet spot around the image.

Specs of the 3G

- Coated optical glass doublet (the same optic as Lensbaby 2.0)
- 50mm focal length
- 37mm filter size
- 12" minimum focusing distance
- 3"(7.62 cm) x 3.25"(8.89 cm) wide, 5.7oz(161.6g)
- drop in aperture (f/2-f/22)

Control Freak
The Control Freak was modeled after the 3G, the lens allows the user to compress and bend the lens and then lock it in place once the desired focus is achieved. Once in locked position the focus can be adjusted with the three posts and the barrel focusing ring.

Specs of Control Freak

- Drop-in Double Glass optic
- Manual/Fingertip Focus
- Drop in aperture disks (f/2-f/22)
- Minimum Focus from 9"(23 cm)
- Maximum Focus to infinity
- 2.25"(5.7 cm) x 2.5"(6.35 cm), 3.7oz(104.9g)

Composer

The Composer was the first Lensbaby lens to feature a ball-and-socket style body coupled with a manual barrel focus. Unlike the original design, the lens stays in position with a locking ring around the base.

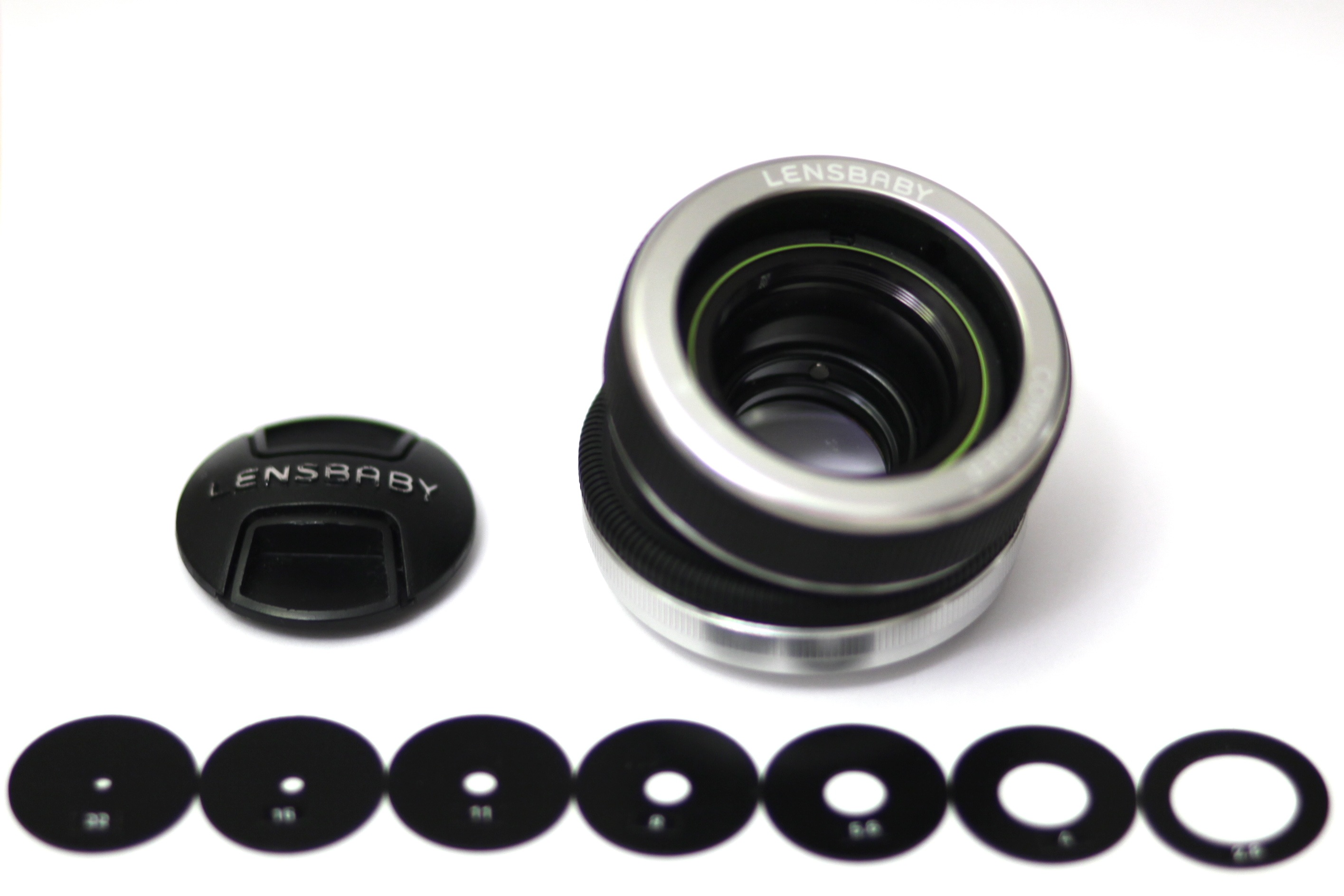
Lensbaby Composer with its aperture disks

The Composer's stability also allows for the long exposures usually needed for pinhole photography.

Specs of the Composer

- Drop-in Double Glass optic
- Drop in aperture disks (f/2.8-f/22)
- Minimum Focus from 18"(45 cm)
- Maximum Focus to infinity
- 2.25"(5.7 cm) x 2.5"(6.35 cm), 3.7oz(104.9g)
- Manual Focus

== Compatibility ==
=== Lens body mount compatibility ===
Lensbaby lenses are compatible with a variety of products and are sold with various third party mounts. The chart below visualizes the available combinations of Lensbaby lenses and third party camera bodies in existence.

Lensbody	Nikon F	Nikon Z	Canon EF	Canon RF	Fuji X	Sony A	Four Thirds	Pentax K	Sony E	Samsung NX	Micro Four Thirds	Canon FD	Leica R	Screw Mount (M42)	Pentax 67	Mamiya 645 Pro-TL	Minolta SR	Contax/ Yashica	Olympus OM
Composer Pro II	Yes	Yes	Yes	Yes	Yes	No	No	No	Yes	No	Yes	No	No	No	No	No	No	No	No
Spark 2.0	Yes	Yes	Yes	Yes	Yes	No	No	No	Yes	No	No	No	No	No	No	No	No	No	No
*Composer Pro	Yes	No	Yes	No	Yes	Yes	Yes	Yes	Yes	Yes	Yes	No	No	No	No	No	No	No	No
*Spark	Yes	No	Yes	No	No	No	No	No	No	No	No	No	No	No	No	No	No	No	No
*Muse	Yes	No	Yes	No	No	Yes	Yes	Yes	No	No	No	No	No	No	No	No	No	No	No
*Scout	Yes	No	Yes	No	No	Yes	Yes	Yes	No	No	No	No	No	No	No	No	No	No	No
*Composer	Yes	No	Yes	No	No	Yes	Yes	Yes	No	No	No	No	No	No	No	No	No	No	No
*Control Freak	Yes	No	Yes	No	No	Yes	Yes	Yes	No	No	No	No	No	No	No	No	No	No	No
*Composer with Tilt Transformer	No	No	No	No	No	No	No	No	Yes	No	Yes	No	No	No	No	No	No	No	No
*3G	Yes	No	Yes	No	No	Yes	Yes	Yes	No	No	No	No	No	No	Yes	Yes	No	No	No
*2.0	Yes	No	Yes	No	No	Yes	Yes	Yes	No	No	No	Yes	Yes	Yes	No	No	Yes	Yes	Yes
*Original Lensbaby	Yes	No	Yes	No	No	Yes	Yes	Yes	No	No	No	Yes	Yes	Yes	No	No	Yes	Yes	Yes

*discontinued

=== Camera compatibility ===
==== Nikon ====
Nikon Camera Models:	D100, D90, D80, D70, D70s, D60, D50, D40, D40x	D3000, D3100, D3200, D5000, D5100, D5200	D7000, D7100	D200, D300, D300s	D3, D3x, D3s, D4, D5	D600, D700, D800, D800E
Works in aperture priority mode	ø	ø	√	√	√	√
In-camera light meter works	ø	ø	√	√	√	√
Only works in manual mode with no in-camera light meter	√	√	ø	ø	ø	ø

==== Canon ====
Canon Camera Models:	Rebel Series, KISS Series	1D, 1Dx, 1D MKiiiN, 5D, 5D MKii, 5D MKiii, 6D, 7D	60D, 60Da, 50D, 40D, 30D, 20Da, 20D, 10D	1000D, 300D, 350D, 400D, 450D, 500D, 550D
Works in aperture priority mode	√	√	√	√
In-camera light meter works	√	√	√	√
Only works in manual mode with no in-camera light meter	ø	ø	ø	ø

==== Sony/Minolta A-mount ====
Sony Camera Models:	A900, A850, A700, NEX series	Sony A580L*, A580*, A560L*, A560*, A550*, A500*, A450*, A390*	A380*, A350*, A330, A300*, A290*, A230, A200*, A100*	A77*, A65*, A55*, A35*, A33*, A58*, A99*	Dynax-series*, Maxxum series*, xi-series*, si-series*, i-series*	9000*, 7000*, 5000*	RD-175*
Works in aperture priority mode	√	√	ø	ø	ø	ø	ø
In-camera light meter works	√	√	ø	ø	ø	ø	ø
Only works in manual mode	ø	ø	√	√	√	√	√

*Camera body needs to have the shutter lock mechanism turned off in order to function with a Lensbaby lens.

==== PL/Motion Picture ====
In order to use a Lensbaby with your digital video camera, you will need to use an adapter. The following companies make adapters which have been tested and used successfully with a Lensbaby: P+S Technik, Redrock M2, Brevis35, Letus35 and SGpro. To use an adapter with the PL mount Lensbaby, you will need to choose an adapter that will attach to your camera (has the correct thread size, for example 72mm or 82mm) and features a PL Mount on the other end. You can also use an adapter with a digital video camera and an SLR mount Lensbaby; in this case you will need to choose an adapter that will attach to your camera and features an SLR (for example, Nikon) Mount on the other end.

==== Olympus ====
Olympus Camera Models	E5, E3, E30	E450, E420	E520, E510, E500	E620, E600,	E-PL1, E-PL2, E-PL3, E-PL5	E-P1, E-P2, E-P3	E-PM1, E-PM2, OM-D E-M5*
Works in aperture priority mode	√	√	√	√	√	√	√
In-camera light meter works	√	√	√	√	√	√	√
Only works in manual mode	ø	ø	ø	ø	ø	ø	ø

*Please note: The Composer with Tilt Transformer is not compatible with the Olympus OM-D E-M5.

==== Panasonic ====
Panasonic Lumix Camera models	GH1, GH2, GH3	G1, G2, G3, G5, G10,	GF1, GF2, GF3, GF5	GX1
Works in aperture priority mode	√	√	√	√
In-camera light meter works	√	√	√	√
Only works in manual mode	ø	ø	ø	ø

== Product comparison ==
=== Optic Swap System ===
The Lensbaby Optic Swap system makes it possible to change the look and feel of digital images by changing out the optic instead of the lens. With the exception of the Sweet 35 and Edge 80 optics, the optic swap tool which is included with every optic as the lid of the optic case. The tool must be aligned with the notches of the optic and twisted counterclockwise to remove the optic.
The Sweet 35 and Edge 80 optics are inserted by aligning them with the dot on the lensbody and twisting it into the locked position. To remove them, push the optic into the lensbody and turn to release it.

=== Product effects ===
Lensbaby products vary in the effects they produce, the table below illustrates the diversity of creative options that can be obtained when using the Lensbaby system.

Tilt	Sweet Spot of Focus	Swirly bokeh	Slice of Focus	Fisheye	Pinhole/Zone	Macro	Soft Focus	Toy	Creative Aperture
Composer Pro, Muse, Spark, Composer*	Sweet Optics (35, 50, 80), Double Glass Optic, Plastic Optic, Single Glass Optic, Sol (22, 45) Lenses	Twist 60 Optic, Burnside 35 Lens	Edge Optics (35, 50, 80)	Fisheye Optic	Pinhole/Zone Plate	Macro Kit, Macro Converters, Fisheye Optic, 0.42x Super Wide Angle	Velvet (28, 56, 85) Lenses, Soft Focus Optic	Plastic Optic, Single Glass Optic	Creative Aperture Kit

*Discontinued

==== Selective focus ====
Most Lensbaby products utilize a technique called selective focus. With a traditional lens, this technique requires coming close to the photograph's subject and opening the camera lens to a wide aperture. This gives a shallow depth of field and creates a look where the main subject is sharp and everything in the front and back of it is blurred. With Lensbaby lenses and optics the selective focus becomes moveable and acts as a spot of focus on one main object, and unlike traditional techniques, objects at the same DOF will also be out of focus if so desired by the user.

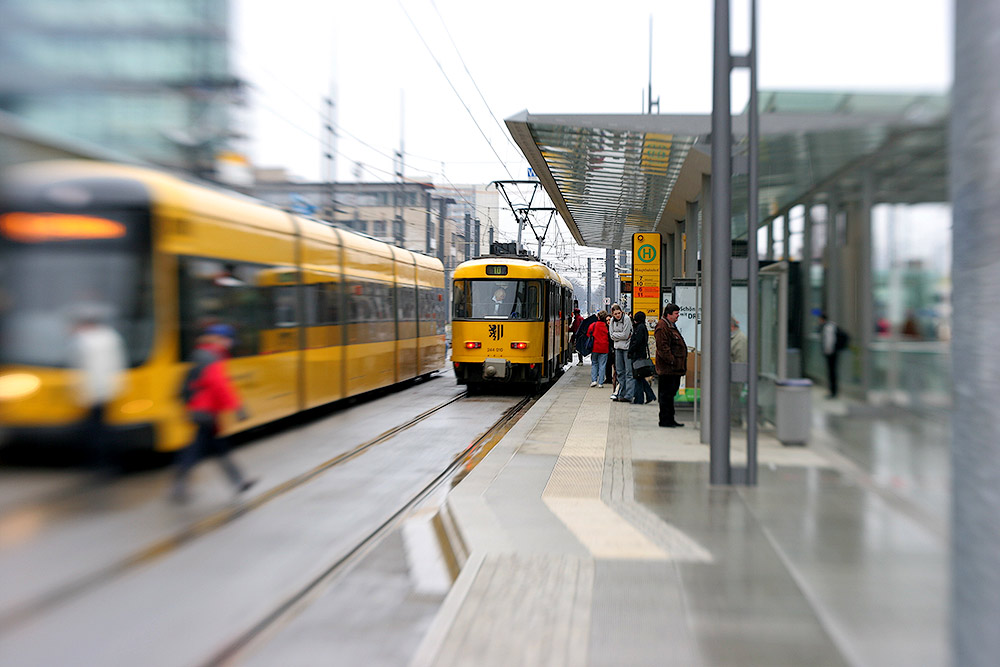
Example of selective focus

==== Sweet Spot versus Slice ====
With the exception of the Soft Focus optic, Fisheye optic, Edge optics and Pinhole/Zone Plate, Lensbaby products traditionally create a sharp round spot of focus with a ring of blur that transcends. The Edge optics creates a different effect similar to a traditional tilt shift lens DOF. The Edge creates a moveable, linear 'slice' of focus which transcends typical DOF and creates sharp focus from edge to edge in a slice of an image while blurring out the rest of the image.

==== Creative apertures ====
Playing off of the utilization of drop in apertures that The Original Lensbaby started, Lensbaby released the ability to create custom drop in apertures. Traditional aperture disks came standard with different sized holes cut into the center, which could be swapped out with a magnetic aperture tool. Because of this the ability to add customized disks was a natural progression of the original concept. Lensbaby offers precut disks in various shapes that had been selected in a contest. Current shapes offered in the custom kit are; swirl, birds, sunburst, splat, flower, heart, star, waves, slats. Blank disks are also still offered at this time by the company.

==== Tilt ====
With the exception of Scout and the stand-alone lenses, Lensbaby allow photographers to tilt the lens moving the selective focus spot around to the desired location. Unlike a tilt shift lens, Lensbaby does not shift perspective, but simply changes the plane of focus.

== In movies and TV shows ==
Lensbaby products have been used in the following films, television shows.

=== Movies ===
- The Diving Bell and Butterfly
- Much Ado About Nothing (2012)
- Terms and Conditions May Apply
- Contagion
- The Raven
- I Melt With You
- How The Fire Fell
- Blind Massage

=== TV ===
- Enlightened
- Dollhouse
- House
- Californication
- Wilfred
- Revenge
- FlashForward
- CSI
- Sherlock
- The Forgotten

=== Shorts ===
Last Day Dream

== See also ==
- Perspective control lens
- View camera
