= E510 =

E510 may refer to:

- Ammonium chloride, a food additive
- Olympus E-510, a camera
