= Diaphragm (optics) =

Thin opaque structure with an opening (aperture) at its center

A Zeiss rotating diaphragm, 1906. One diaphragm with five apertures.

In optics, a diaphragm is a thin opaque structure with an opening (aperture) at its center. The role of the diaphragm is to stop the passage of light, except for the light passing through the aperture. Thus it is also called a stop (an aperture stop, if it limits the brightness of light reaching the focal plane, or a field stop or flare stop for other uses of diaphragms in lenses). The diaphragm is placed in the light path of a lens or objective, and the size of the aperture regulates the amount of light that passes through the lens. The centre of the diaphragm's aperture coincides with the optical axis of the lens system.

Most modern cameras use a type of adjustable diaphragm known as an iris diaphragm, and often referred to simply as an iris.

See the articles on aperture and f-number for the photographic effect and system of quantification of varying the opening in the diaphragm.

== Iris diaphragms versus other types ==
Nine-blade iris

The opening and closing of the diaphragm of a Hasselblad L3D-100c, the wide-angle camera of the Mavic 4 Pro drone. The aperture closes from f/2 to f/22 and opens up again to f/2.

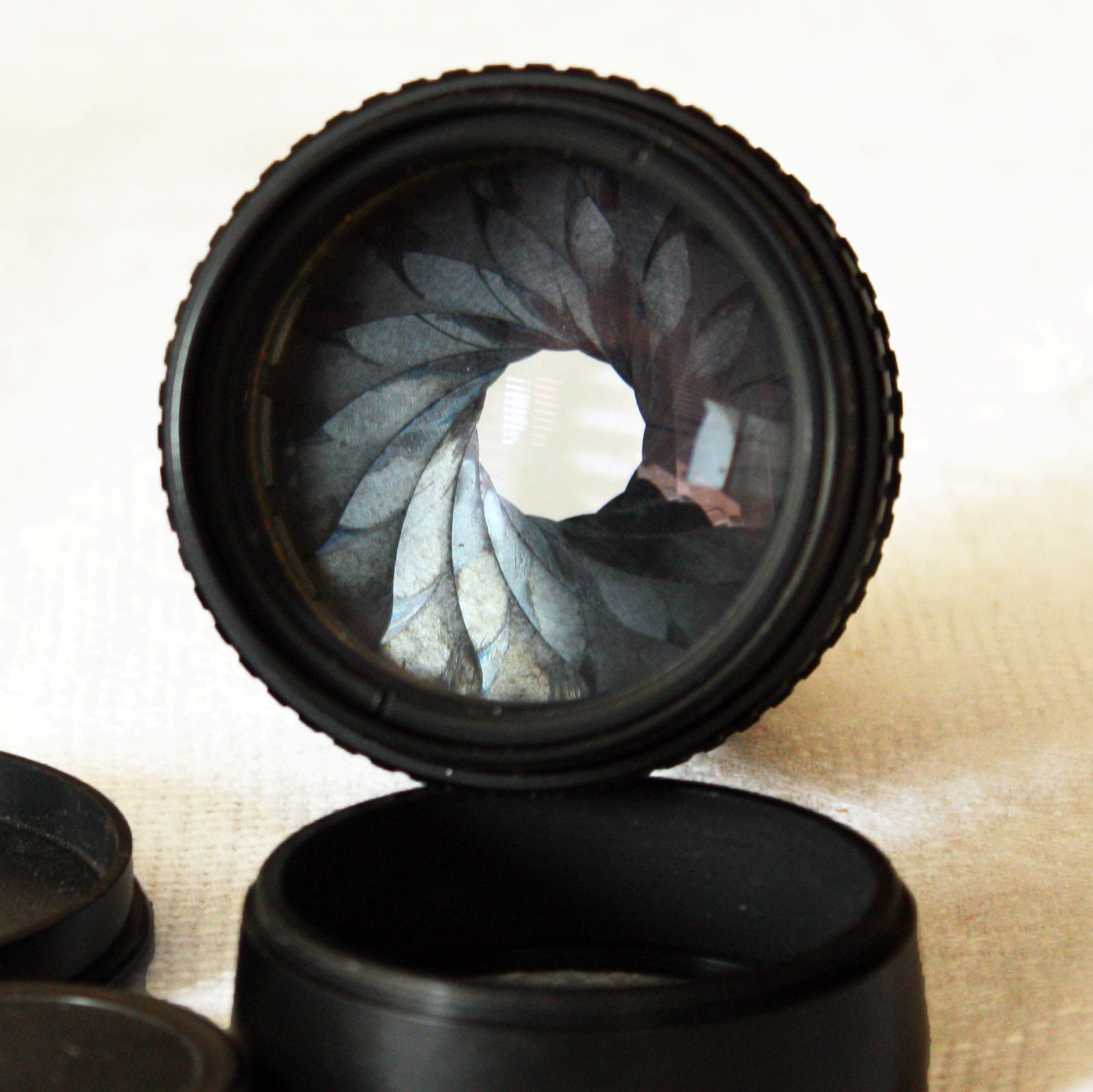
Pentacon 2.8/135 lens with 15-blade iris

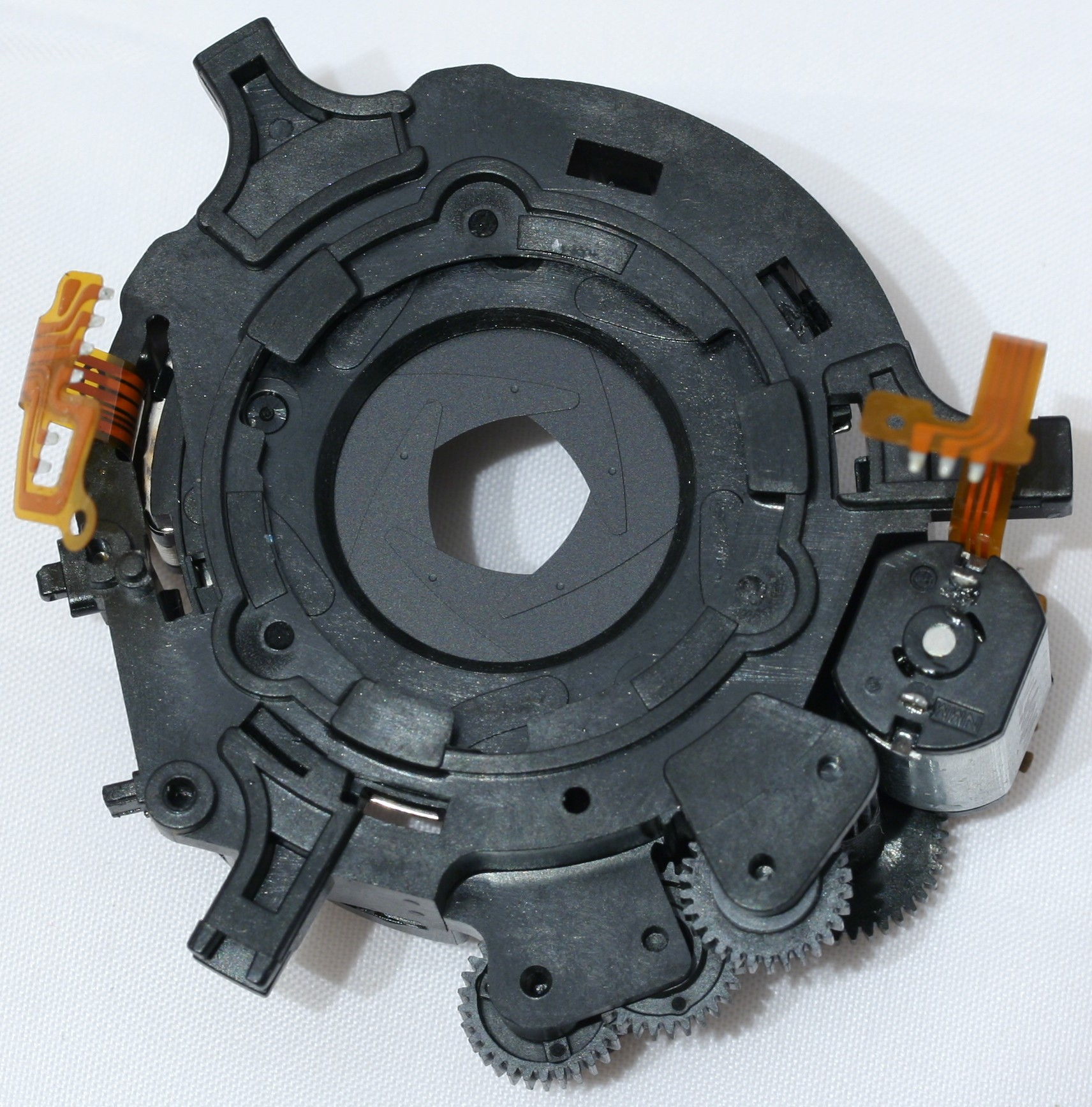
Aperture mechanism of Canon 50mm f/1.8 II lens, with five blades

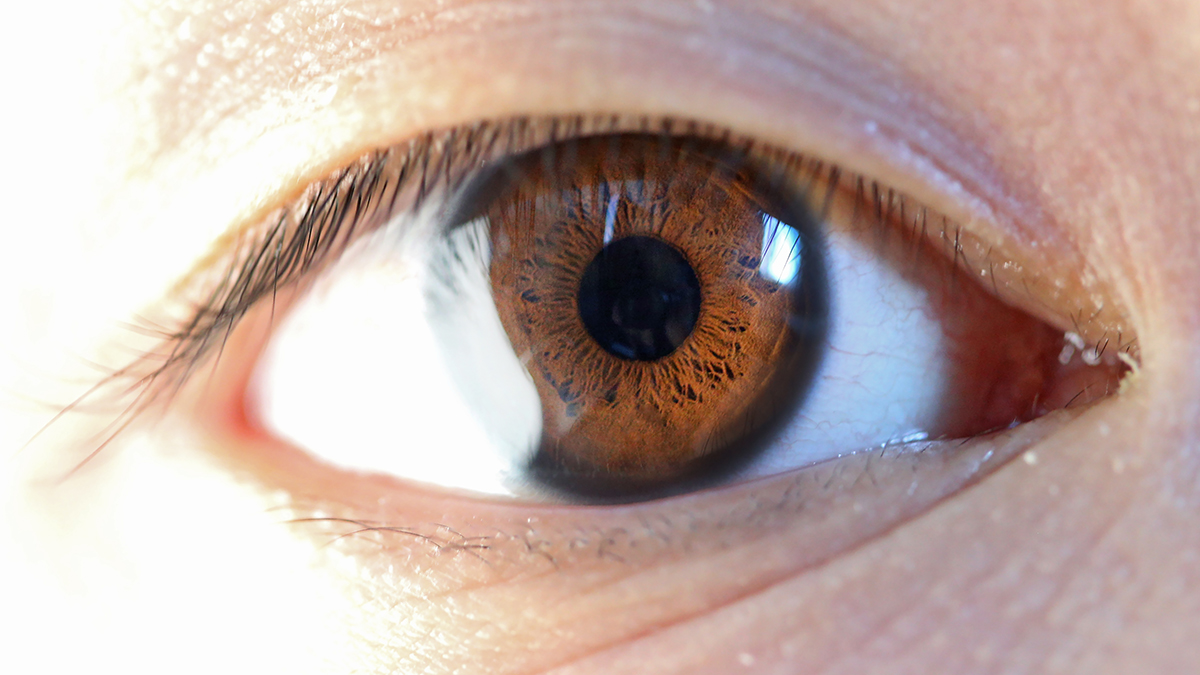
In the human eye, the iris (light brown) acts as the diaphragm and continuously constricts and dilates its aperture (the pupil)

A 750nm titanium-sapphire laser beam passing through an iris diaphragm, while opening and closing the iris. Note changes in beam diameter observed on the downstream golden mirror.

A natural optical system that has a diaphragm and an aperture is the human eye. The iris is the diaphragm, the pupil is the aperture. In the human eye, the iris can both constrict and dilate, which varies the size of the pupil. Unsurprisingly, a photographic lens with the ability to continuously vary the size of its aperture (the hole in the middle of the annular structure) is known as an iris diaphragm.

An iris diaphragm can reduce the amount of light that hits a detector by decreasing the aperture, usually with "leaves" or "blades" that form a circle.

In the early years of photography, a lens could be fitted with one of a set of interchangeable diaphragms, often as brass strips known as Waterhouse stops or Waterhouse diaphragms. The iris diaphragm in most modern still and video cameras is adjusted by movable blades, simulating the iris of the eye.

The diaphragm has two to twenty blades (with most lenses today featuring between five and ten blades), depending on price and quality of the device in which it is used. Straight blades result in a polygon shape of the diaphragm opening, while curved blades improve the roundness of the iris opening. In a photograph, the number of blades that the iris diaphragm has can be guessed by counting the number of diffraction spikes converging from a light source or bright reflection. For an odd number of blades, there are twice as many spikes as there are blades.

In case of an even number of blades, the two spikes per blade will overlap each other, so the number of spikes visible will be the number of blades in the diaphragm used. This is most apparent in pictures taken in the dark with small bright spots, for example night cityscapes. Some cameras, such as the Olympus XA or lenses such as the MC Zenitar-ME1, however, use a two-bladed diaphragm with right-angle blades creating a square aperture.

Similarly, out-of-focus points of light (circles of confusion) appear as polygons with the same number of sides as the aperture has blades. If the blurred light is circular, then it can be inferred that the aperture is either round or the image was shot "wide-open" (with the blades recessed into the sides of the lens, allowing the interior edge of the lens barrel to effectively become the iris).

The shape of the iris opening has a direct relation with the appearance of the blurred out-of-focus areas in an image called bokeh. A rounder opening produces softer and more natural out-of-focus areas.

Some lenses utilize specially shaped diaphragms in order to create certain effects. This includes the diffusion discs or sieve aperture of the Rodenstock Tiefenbildner-Imagon, Fuji and Sima soft focus lenses, the sector aperture of Seibold's Dreamagon, or the circular apodization filter in the Minolta/Sony Smooth Trans Focus or Fujifilm APD lenses.

Some modern automatic point-and-shoot cameras do not have a diaphragm at all, and simulate aperture changes by using an automatic ND filter. Unlike a real diaphragm, this has no effect on depth of field. A real diaphragm when more-closed will cause the depth of field to increase (i.e., cause the background and the subject to both appear more in-focus at the same time) and if the diaphragm is opened up again the depth of field will decrease (i.e., the background and foreground will share less and less of the same focal plane).

== History ==
In his 1567 work La Pratica della Perspettiva Venetian nobleman Daniele Barbaro (1514–1570) described using a camera obscura with a biconvex lens as a drawing aid and points out that the picture is more vivid if the lens is covered as much as to leave a circumference in the middle.

In 1762, Leonhard Euler says with respect to telescopes that, "it is necessary likewise to furnish the inside of the tube with one or more diaphragms, perforated with a small circular aperture, the better to exclude all extraneous light."

In 1867, Désiré van Monckhoven, in one of the earliest books on photographic optics, draws a distinction betweens stops and diaphragms in photography, but not in optics, saying:

"Let us see what takes place when the stop is removed from the lens to a proper distance. In this case the stop becomes a diaphragm.
* In optics, stop and diaphragm are synonyms. But in photographic optics they are only so by an unfortunate confusion of language. The stop reduces the lens to its central aperture; the diaphragm, on the contrary, allows all the segments of the lens to act, but only on the different radiating points placed symmetrically and concentrically in relation to the axis of the lens, or of the system of lenses (of which the axis is, besides, in every case common)."

This distinction was maintained in Wall's 1889 Dictionary of Photography (see figure), but disappeared after Ernst Abbe's theory of stops unified these concepts.

According to Rudolf Kingslake, the inventor of the iris diaphragm is unknown. Others credit Joseph Nicéphore Niépce for this device, around 1820. J. H. Brown, a member of the Royal Microscopical Society, appears to have invented a popular improved iris diaphragm by 1867.

Kingslake has more definite histories for some other diaphragm types, such as M. Noton's adjustable cat eye diaphragm of two sliding squares in 1856, and the Waterhouse stops of John Waterhouse in 1858.

In 1858, lens maker Charles C Harrison along with Joseph Schnitzer patented an adjustable "stop" for his lenses, which featured six blades that could be moved to shrink the aperture. Harrison and Schnitzer's contribution to photography has gone largely unrecognized.

The Hamburg Observatory-Bergedorf location had a 60 cm (~23.6 inch) aperture Great Refractor by Reposold and Steinheil (Lenses). One unique feature of the Hamburg Great Refractor is an iris diaphragm that allows the aperture to be adjusted from 5 to 60 cm. This telescope was activated in the early 1910s.

== See also ==
- Aperture
- f-number
- Shutter (photography)
- Leaf shutter
- Diffraction spike
