= Olympus E-620 =

2009 Four Thirds digital single-lens reflex camera

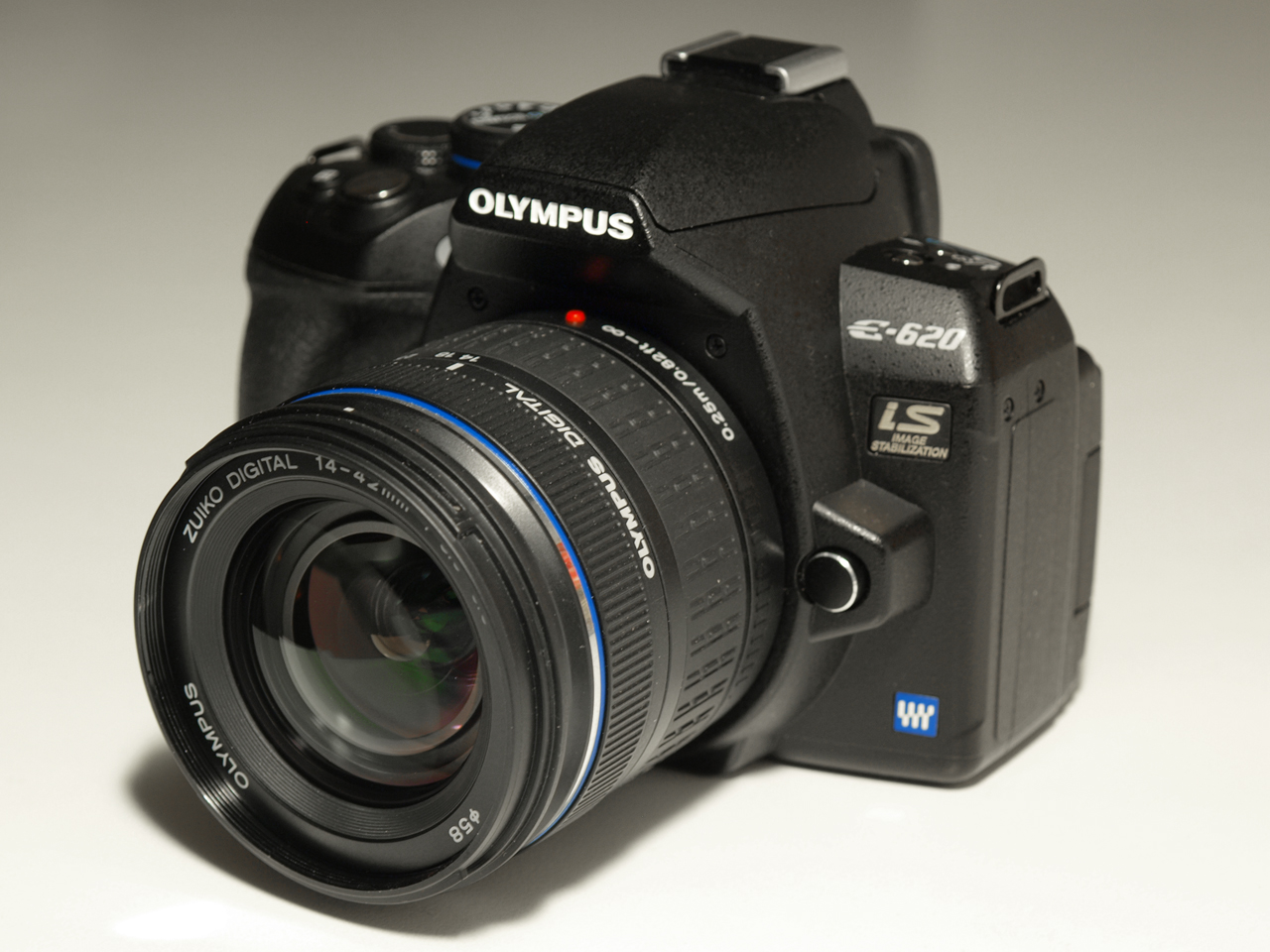

Overview
- Maker: Olympus Corporation
- Type: Digital single-lens reflex camera

Lens
- Lens mount: Four Thirds
- Lens: Four Thirds

Sensor/medium
- Sensor: Live MOS Four Thirds 17.3 mm × 13.0 mm (2× crop factor)
- Maximum resolution: 12.3 million effective pixels, 4,032 × 3,024 pixels
- Film speed: ISO 100 to 3200
- Storage media: CompactFlash Type I/II (UDMA), Microdrive, xD-Picture Card

Focusing
- Focus modes: Single Shot AF, Single Shot AF + MF, Continuous AF + MF, Continuous AF, Manual Focus
- Focus areas: 7-Point TTL Phase Difference Detection AF

Exposure/metering
- Exposure modes: Auto, Program AE with shift), Aperture Priority AE, Shutter Priority AE, Manual, Scene Program, Scene Select (Scene Modes: Portrait, Landscape, Macro, Sport, Night + Portrait, Children, High Key, Low Key, DIS Mode, Nature Macro, Candle, Sunset, Fireworks, Documents)
- Exposure metering: TTL Open-Aperture Metering System (49 Zones)

Flash
- Flash: Standard 4/3 flash hot shoe compatible with 4/3 system flashes, automatic built-in pop-up, 13 m ISO 100 guide number, 27 mm (equivalent in 135 format) lens focal length coverage;

Shutter
- Shutter: focal-plane shutter
- Shutter speed range: 60–1/4000 seconds
- Continuous shooting: 4.1 frame/s JPEG or 5 RAW

Viewfinder
- Viewfinder: Eye-Level TTL Optical Pentamirror with 96% coverage and 0.96× magnification

Image processing
- White balance: Auto, daylight, shade, cloudy, tungsten light, white fluorescent light, flash, manual, user-set
- WB bracketing: ±3 stops in 1-stop increments;

General
- LCD screen: Vari-Angle 2.7'' HyperCrystal III TFT LCD with 230,000 pixels
- Battery: BLS-1 Li-ion battery pack
- Weight: 475 g (17 oz) (1.047 lb), body only
- Made in: China

The Olympus E-620 is a Four Thirds digital single-lens reflex camera from Olympus announced February 24, 2009. It combines features of the E-420 (smaller size), E-520 (image stabilization), and E-30 (new 12.3 MP sensor, slightly larger viewfinder, fold-out LCD, newer AF sensor).

== Features ==
The camera is marketed by Olympus as the world's smallest DSLR with built-in image stabilization (IS). It is 130 mm × 94 mm × 60 mm in size and weighs 475 grams (1.047 lb), body only (533 g or 1.175 lb with battery and a Compact Flash memory card).

As with all Four Thirds cameras it has a crop factor of 2.0.

Apart from being sold as camera body only, the E-620 is available with three lens configurations:

- The Zuiko 14–42 f/3.5–5.6 lens
- The 14–42 lens and the Zuiko 40–150 f/4–5.6 telephoto zoom
- The extremely compact 25 mm f/2.8 "pancake" lens

Unlike the E-420 and E-520 it has an Olympus-designed battery grip, HLD-5. The E-620 also has its own underwater housing, PT-E06, submersible down to 40 meters.

== E-600 ==
In August 2009 a slightly down-specced budget version of the E-620 was announced by Olympus, this model was called the E-600. The features not present on the E-600 are the illuminated function buttons and all but four of the art filters, other than that the E600 is an E-620 and has gradually spread out of North America through grey imports of both new and used cameras and is often thought of as a better value option to the E-620.

== Gallery ==
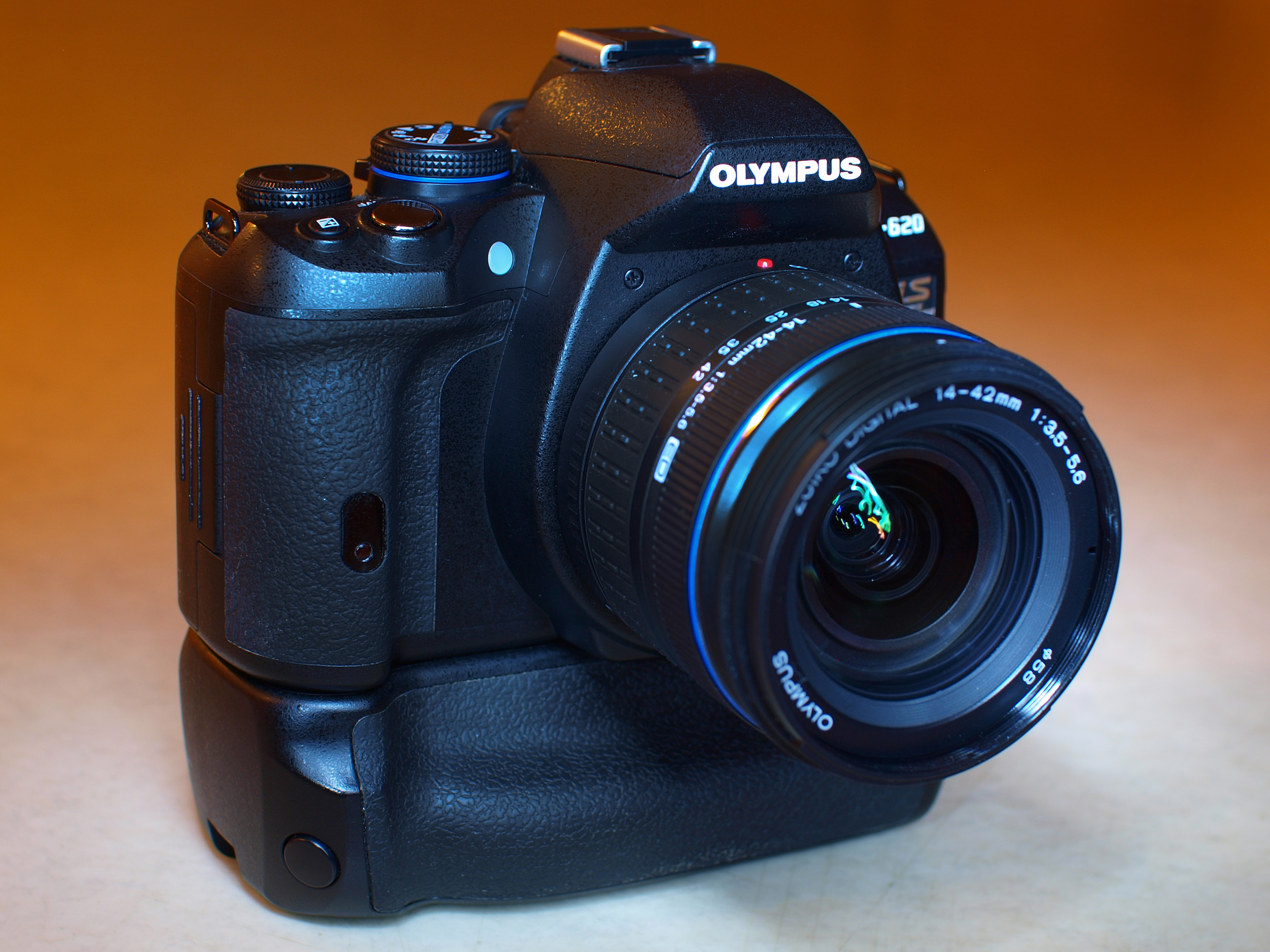
With HLD-5 battery grip.

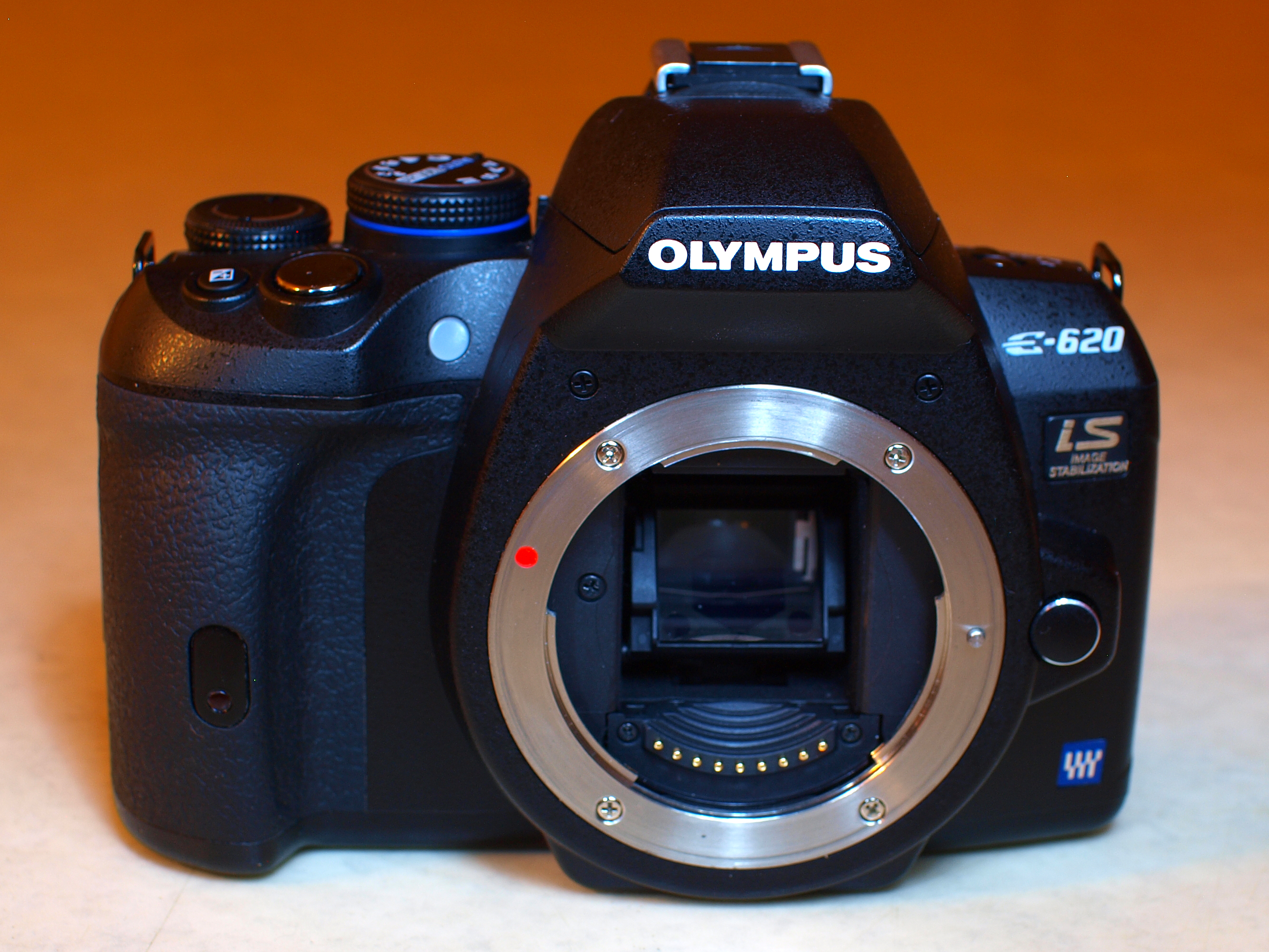
Body with lens removed.

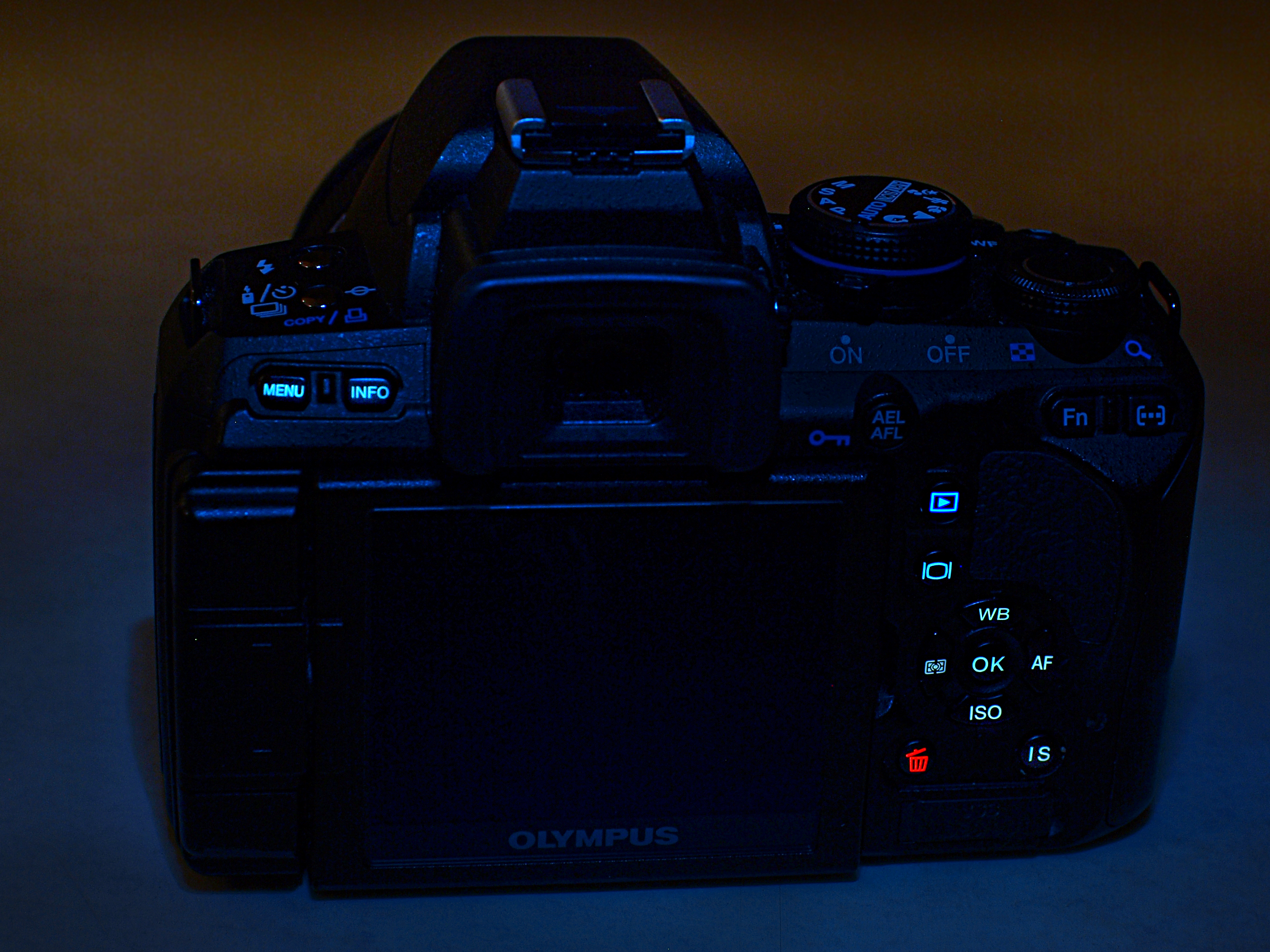
Illuminated buttons.

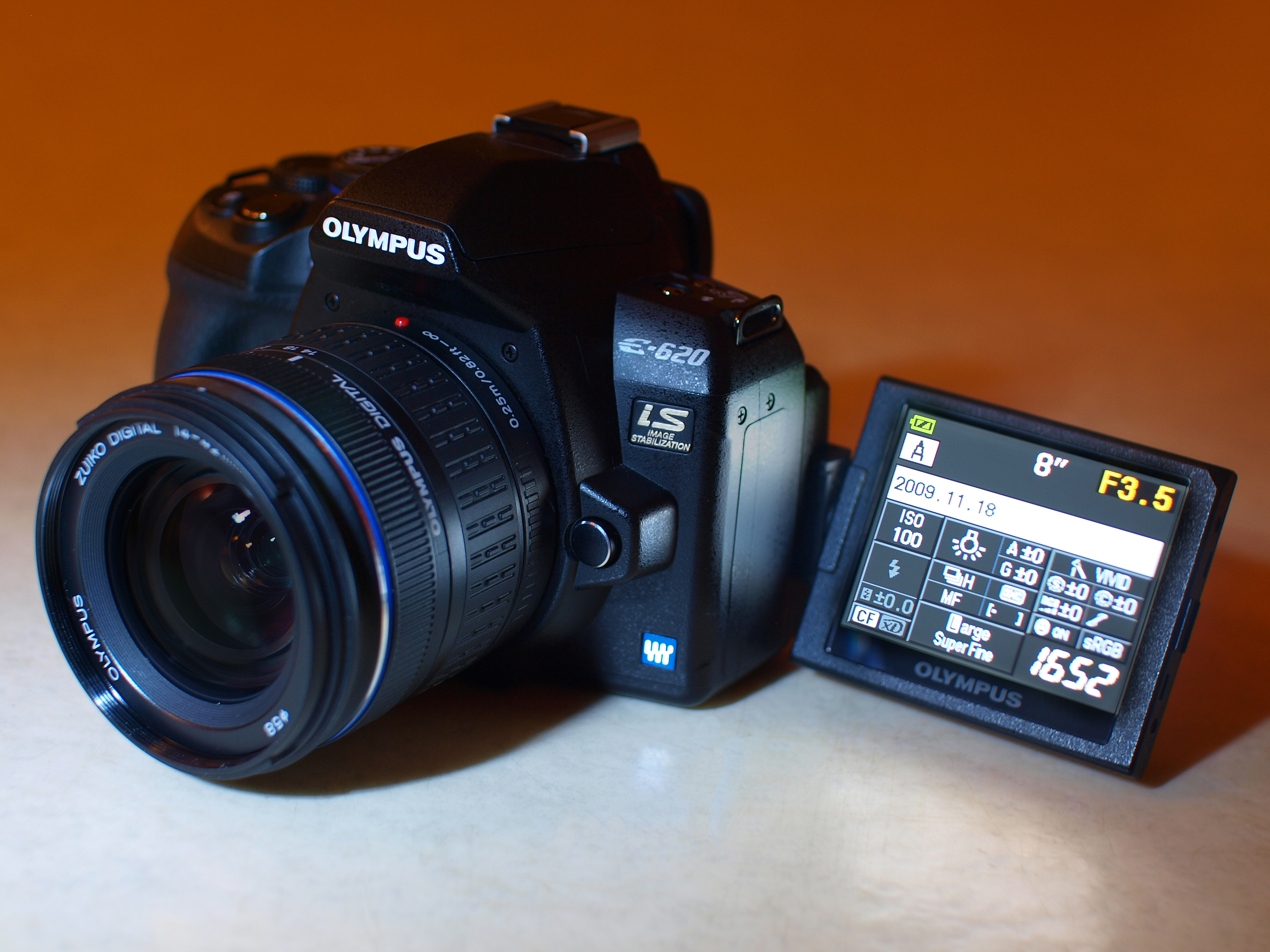
LCD screen folded out.

| | 2003 | 2004 | 2005 | 2006 | 2007 | 2008 | 2009 | 2010 | 2011 | 2012 | 2013 |
| Flagship | | E-1 | | | | E-3 | | | E-5 | | |
| High-end | | | | | | | E-30 | | | | |
| Midrange | | | | | | | E-620 | | | | |
| Midrange | | | | | | | | E-600 | | | |
| Midrange | | | | E-500 | E-510 | | E-520 | | | | |
| Entry-level | | | E-300 | E-330 | | | E-450 | | | | |
| Entry-level | | | | E-400 | E-410 | | E-420 | | | | |
