= Waterhouse stop =

Interchangeable camera lens aperture

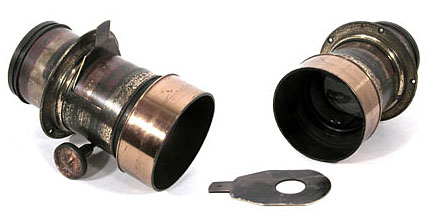
Two views of an early Dallmeyer Soft Focus Series B with a focal length of 8½" and fast maximum aperture of f/3, with a Waterhouse stop shown inserted (left) and removed (right).

Cassell's Cyclopedia of Photography 1911 identifies John Waterhouse of Halifax as the inventor in 1858 of Waterhouse stops, "a separate stop being required for each opening."

The Waterhouse stop or Waterhouse diaphragm is an interchangeable diaphragm with an aperture (hole) for controlling the entry of light into a camera. A thin piece of metal (the diaphragm) is drilled with a hole (the aperture); a set of these with varying hole sizes makes up a set of Waterhouse stops, corresponding to what today we call f-stops or f-numbers. Photographic lens makers provided slots in lens barrels for the insertion of the chosen stop.

== History ==
This apparatus was invented by the pioneering 19th-century photographer John Waterhouse of Halifax in 1858. It has also been reported to have been independently invented by Mr. H. R. Smyth, and described by Waterhouse as early as 1856. The innovation was quickly put to use due to its convenience: "Aperture openings were at first controlled by unscrewing the lens and inserting stops of the appropriate size between the lens components, though after 1858 photographers used the more convenient Waterhouse stops which eliminated unscrewing the components."

Alternatively, one or more pieces of metal would be drilled with various sized holes. The stop could then be chosen by sliding the diaphragm to different positions in the lens slot. Such multi-aperture diaphragms were also sometimes referred to as Waterhouse stops, due to their operation based on sliding through a slot in the lens barrel.

== Uses ==
Waterhouse stops were also used in photographic enlargers in the darkroom.

Today, Waterhouse stops are largely obsolete; most modern photographic lenses are made with an iris diaphragm. Some compact digital cameras use 2-hole diaphragms for limited aperture control. One modern device that still uses interchangeable stops is the Lensbaby. Others are a new Petzval lens and an achromat lens being crowdfunded by Lomography.
