= Olympus E-500 =

Digital camera model

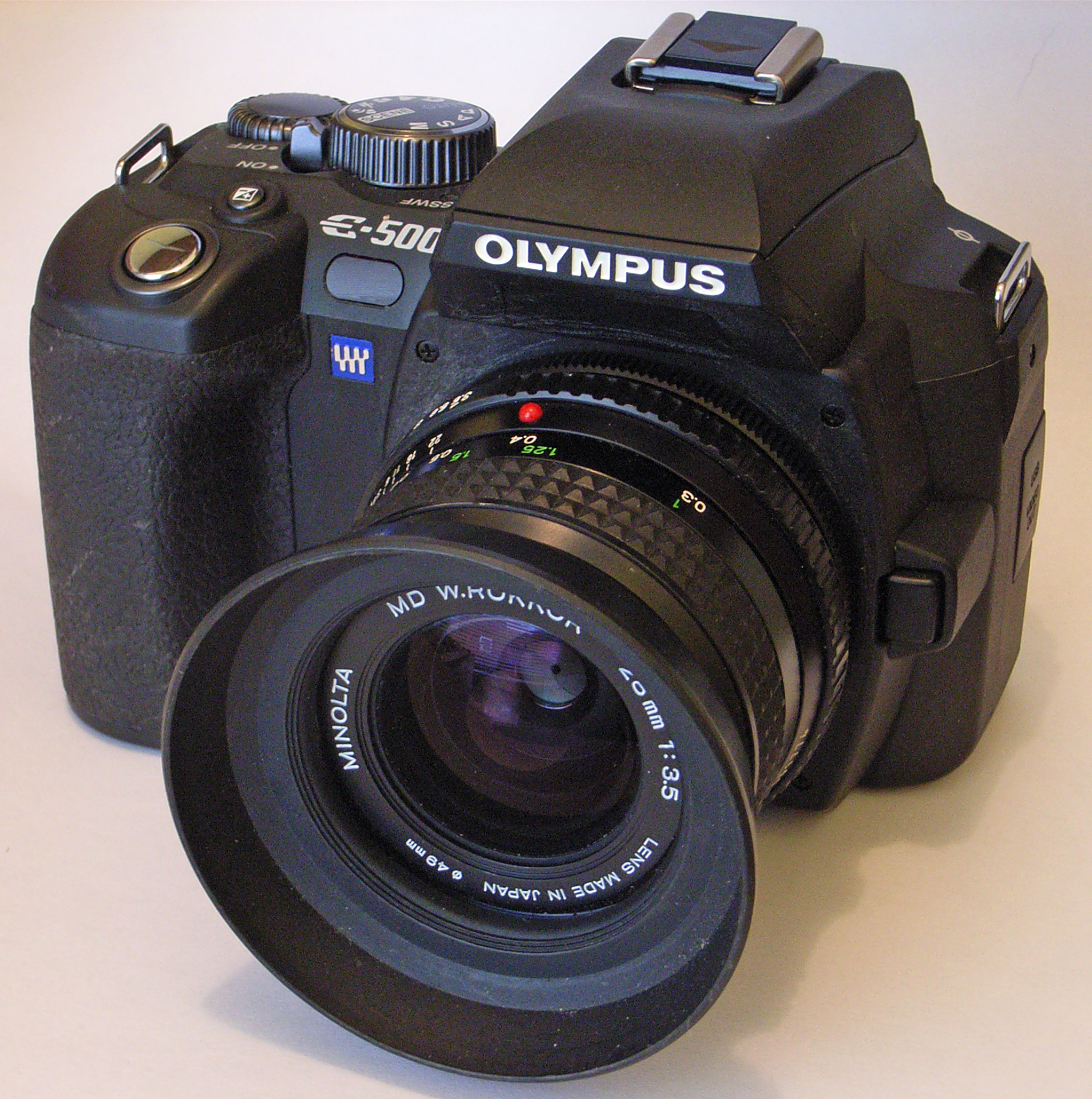

Overview
- Maker: Olympus Corporation
- Type: Digital single-lens reflex

Lens
- Lens mount: Four Thirds
- Lens: Interchangeable (Four Thirds mount)

Sensor/medium
- Sensor: Kodak KAF-8300CE Four Thirds System FFT-CCD
- Maximum resolution: 3,264 × 2,448 (8 million)
- Film speed: ISO 50–3200
- Storage media: CompactFlash (Type I or Type II); XD card

Focusing
- Focus modes: Single shot AF, Continuous AF and/or Manual
- Focus areas: 3-Point Multiple AF

Exposure/metering
- Exposure modes: Automatic, Portrait, Landscape, Landscape and Portrait, Macro, Sport, Night Portrait, Night Scene, Children, High Key, Low Key, Candle, Sunset, Fireworks, Documents, Beach and Snow, Manual, Aperture Priority, Shutter Priority
- Exposure metering: TTL full-aperture exposure metering system
- Metering modes: Spot, Center Weighted, Digital ESP

Flash
- Flash: Built-in TTL Speedlight with hotshoe
- Flash bracketing: +5/−5 EV in 1/3, 1/2 or 1 step

Shutter
- Shutter: Computerized focal-plane type
- Shutter speed range: 1/4000 to 60 s (max 8 Min in "Bulb" mode)
- Continuous shooting: 2.5 frame/s, unlimited shots (JPEG) or 4 shots (RAW/TIFF)

Viewfinder
- Viewfinder: Optical TTL with pentamirror

Image processing
- White balance: Automatic, Incandescent, Fluorescent, Direct Sunlight, Flash, Cloudy, Shade, Preset (in kelvins)

General
- LCD screen: 2.5 in (64 mm), 215 kpixel
- Battery: Olympus BLM-1 family
- Weight: 430 g (15 oz) (0.95 lb) without battery
- Made in: China

The Olympus E-500 (Olympus EVOLT E-500 in North America) is an 8-megapixel digital SLR camera manufactured by Olympus of Japan and based on the Four Thirds System. It was announced on 26 September 2005. Like the E-300 launched the previous year, it uses a 17.3 × 13 mm Kodak KAF-8300CE full-frame-transfer CCD image sensor.

== Features ==
Unlike the E-300 and the E-300's successor, the Olympus E-330, the E-500 retains the traditional SLR appearance, with a humped pentamirror box instead of the E-300's unique Porro mirror arrangement. The mirror box also bears the onboard flash. The viewfinder hump means the E-500 is taller than the E-300, but in other dimensions it is smaller.

The E-500 uses Olympus' patented Supersonic Wave Filter dust reduction system to shake dust from the sensor during startup and when requested by the user; this largely eliminates the problem of dust accumulation on the surface of the image sensor. Image processing is done with Olympus' TruePic Turbo system.

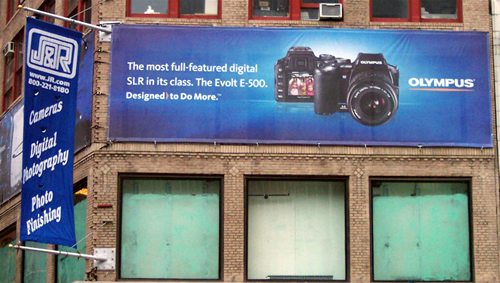
E-500 advertised in New York City.

Improvements over the E-300 include a 2.5-inch (64 mm) rear LCD screen, 49 zone metering (the E-300's total is undocumented, but believed to be 3), spot metering, an RGB histogram to identify clipping across the three color channels in post-shot review, optional improved noise filtering for low-light photography, and the ability to apply software color filters in black-and-white shooting.

In a buyers guide distributed by the UK Digital SLR magazine (December 06, 2nd edition), the Olympus E-500 camera was identified as an intermediate digital SLR camera — capable of functioning as a professional tool in most situations, well above what the average street price of £379 (at time of article) reflects.

The E-500 was available in five different packages in the United States; these were:

- Body only (no lens)
- Body plus 14–45 mm Zuiko Digital lens
- Body plus 17.5–45 mm Zuiko Digital lens
- Body plus 14–45 mm and 40–150 mm Zuiko Digital lenses
- Body plus 17.5–45 mm and 40–150 mm Zuiko Digital lenses (Costco in-store package)

The successor to the E-500 is the E-510. Released in 2007, the E-510 provides several feature improvements including a new 10-megapixel Live MOS Sensor with claimed lower image noise at high ISO compared to the E-500, LiveView and in-body Image Stabilization in approximately the same body size as the E-500.

	2003	2004	2005	2006	2007	2008	2009	2010	2011	2012	2013
Flagship		E-1				E-3			E-5		
High-end							E-30				
Midrange							E-620				
Midrange								E-600			
Midrange				E-500	E-510		E-520				
Entry-level			E-300	E-330			E-450				
Entry-level				E-400	E-410		E-420				
