= John Waterhouse (astronomer) =

British astronomer and meteorologist

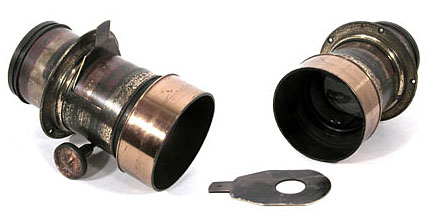
Two views of an early Dallmeyer Soft Focus Series B with a focal length of 8 1/2" and fast maximum aperture of f/3, with a Waterhouse stop shown inserted (left) and removed (right).

John Waterhouse (3 August 1806 – 13 February 1879) was a British astronomer and meteorologist who invented Waterhouse stops.

== Life and works ==
He was born at Well Head House in Halifax, Yorkshire the eldest son of John and Grace Elizabeth (née Rawson) Waterhouse. Well Head had extensive gardens with greenhouses and a staff of 6 gardeners. They cultivated exotic ferns, including a Todea superba which Waterhouse had imported from New Zealand in 1860 and which is now at Kew Gardens. At the house, he built an observatory and meteorological station. Louis John Crossley studied at his laboratory.

In 1834 he was President of the Halifax Mechanics' Institute. In the same year he was elected as a Fellow of the Royal Society. He was also a Fellow of the Royal Astronomical Society.

In 1839 he travelled around the world for health reasons.

Over a period of 8 years (1866–1873), he made detailed observations of the weather and of the night skies from Well Head, which he published in 1874. A keen photographer, he produced several inventions, including Waterhouse stops for cameras and photographic lenses and an alkaline gold toning bath (see page from 1892 book, figure to the right, below).

An invention of Waterhouse was an alkaline gold toning bath.

He was appointed Deputy Lieutenant of the West Riding of Yorkshire.

He died at Well House in 1879.
