= Olympus E-510 =

Digital camera model

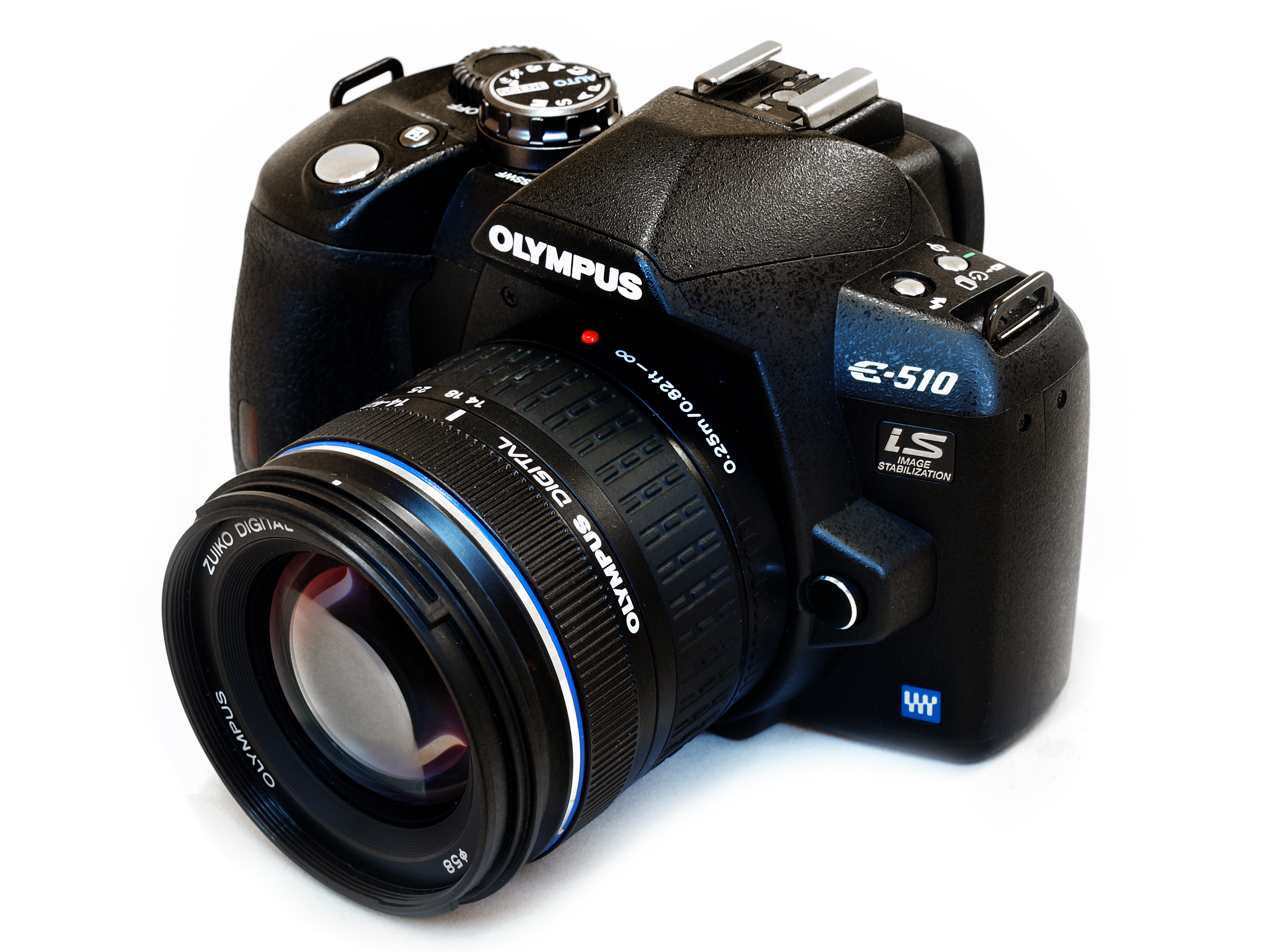

Overview
- Maker: Olympus Corporation
- Type: Digital single-lens reflex

Lens
- Lens mount: Four Thirds
- Lens: Interchangeable Four Thirds System

Sensor/medium
- Sensor: 17.30 × 13.00 mm Live MOS
- Maximum resolution: 3,648 × 2,736 (10 megapixels)
- Film speed: 100–1600
- Storage media: CompactFlash (CF) (Type I or Type II) + xD Picture Card

Focusing
- Focus modes: Single AF (S-AF) / Continuous AF (C-AF) / Manual Focus (MF) / S-AF + MF / C-AF + MF
- Focus areas: 3-point TTL Phase Diff
- Focus bracketing: 3 frames in 0.3, 0.7, 1 EV steps selectable

Exposure/metering
- Exposure modes: (7) Auto, Program, Aperture priority, Shutter priority, Manual, Scene, and Scene select AE
- Exposure metering: TTL open-aperture metering system 49-point multi-pattern metering
- Metering modes: ESP multi-pattern, Center-Weighted, Spot, Highlight based spot, Shadow based spot

Flash
- Flash: Retractable flash TTL Auto, Manual
- Flash bracketing: 3 frames in 0.3, 0.7, 1 EV steps selectable

Shutter
- Shutter: Computerized focal-plane shutter
- Shutter speed range: 60 s – 1/4000 s
- Continuous shooting: 3.0 fps

Viewfinder
- Viewfinder: Optical TTL

Image processing
- White balance: Auto, 7 preset settings, custom, one-touch, ±7 steps in each R-B/G-M axis
- WB bracketing: 3 frames in 2, 4, 6 steps selectable in each R-G/G-M axis.

General
- LCD screen: 2.5" TFT LCD, 230,000 pixels, live preview capable
- Battery: Lithium-Ion rechargeable
- Optional battery packs: Third party grips available
- Dimensions: 136 mm (W) × 91.5 mm (H) × 68 mm (D) / 5.35 in.(W) × 3.6 in. (W) × 2.67 in. (D) (excluding protrusions)
- Weight: 470 g or 17 oz (body only)
- Made in: China

The Olympus E-510 (or Olympus EVOLT E-510 in North America) is a 10-megapixel digital single-lens reflex (DSLR) camera oriented to the "prosumer" or "hobbyist" market.

== Details ==
Announced in March 2007 to succeed the E-500, it represents the first use of the new Panasonic MOS sensors instead of the Kodak CCD sensors that Olympus had used previously. It is also the first Olympus DSLR to include in-body image stabilization; most subsequent E-system cameras include an IS system. It also included "Live View", the ability to view the image on the rear screen before taking the photo.

The E-510 body and lens mount conform to the "Four Thirds System" standard, providing compatibility with other lenses for that system. Four-Thirds is a digital SLR standard using a crop factor of 2x; this means that Four-Thirds lenses can be made smaller and cheaper, but that the cameras exhibit somewhat worse high ISO performance.

As with all E-system cameras, the E-510 uses Olympus' Supersonic Wave Filter dust reduction system to shake dust from the sensor during startup and when requested by the user; this largely eliminates the problem of dust accumulation on the surface of the image sensor.

The E-510 was released in a number of different combinations for purchase: the camera body only, the body bundled with a 14-42mm 1:3.5-5.6 lens, and the body bundled with 14-42mm 1:3.5-5.6 and 40-150mm 1:4-5.6 lenses. Since Four-Thirds has a crop factor of 2x, the 35mm equivalent focal length of these lenses is twice the actual focal length.

In the second quarter of 2008, the E-510's successor, the E-520, was released with minor updates to the Live View system, wireless flash capability, and a claimed improved metering system.

| | 2003 | 2004 | 2005 | 2006 | 2007 | 2008 | 2009 | 2010 | 2011 | 2012 | 2013 |
| Flagship | | E-1 | | | | E-3 | | | E-5 | | |
| High-end | | | | | | | E-30 | | | | |
| Midrange | | | | | | | E-620 | | | | |
| Midrange | | | | | | | | E-600 | | | |
| Midrange | | | | E-500 | E-510 | | E-520 | | | | |
| Entry-level | | | E-300 | E-330 | | | E-450 | | | | |
| Entry-level | | | | E-400 | E-410 | | E-420 | | | | |
