= Olympus E-520 =

Digital camera model

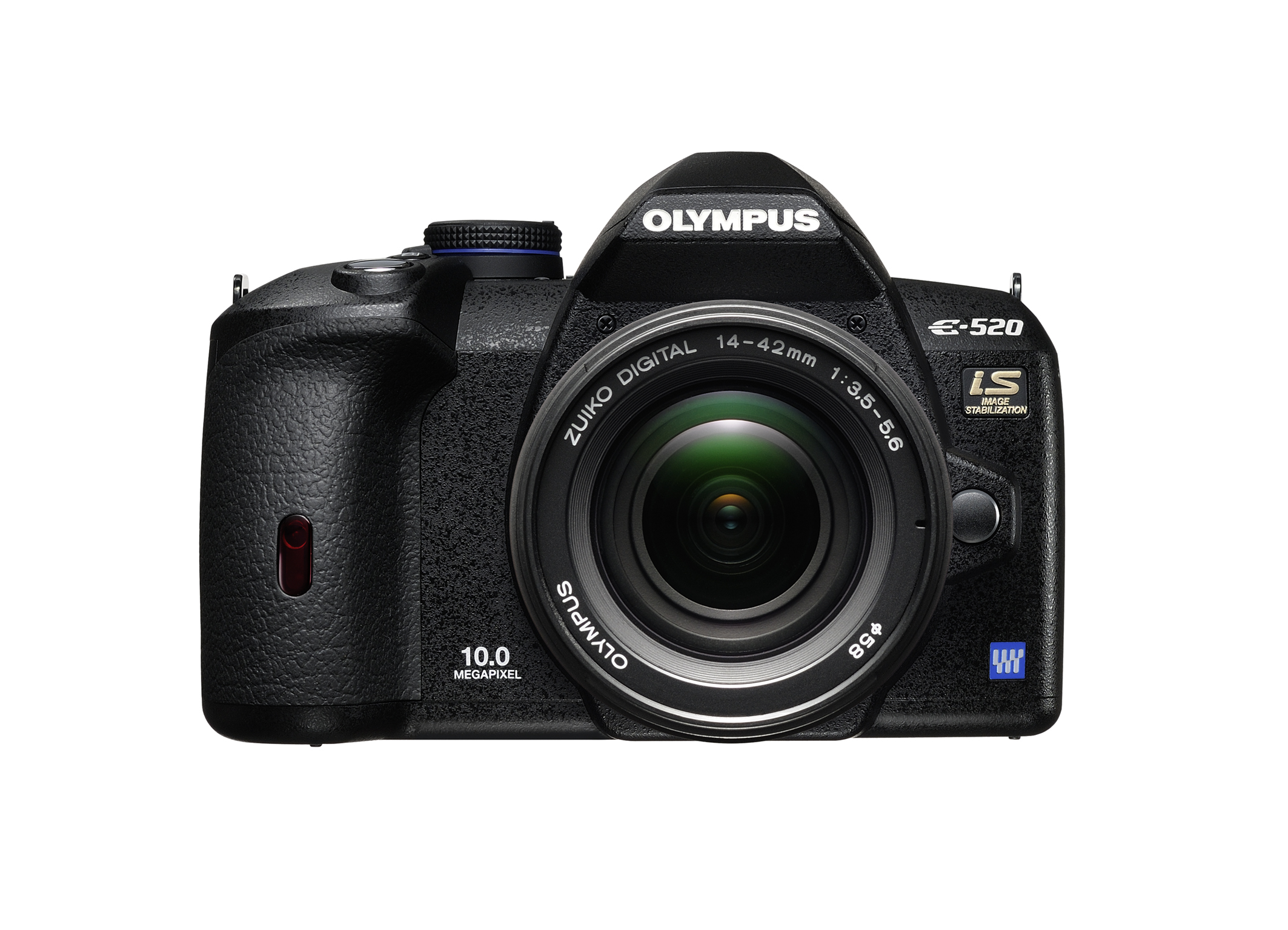

Overview
- Maker: Olympus Corporation
- Type: Digital single-lens reflex

Lens
- Lens mount: Four Thirds
- Lens: Interchangeable Four Thirds System

Sensor/medium
- Sensor: 18.00 x 13.50 mm Live MOS
- Maximum resolution: 3648 × 2736 (10 megapixels)
- Film speed: 100–1600
- Storage media: CompactFlash (CF) (Type I or Type II) + xD Picture Card

Focusing
- Focus areas: 3-point TTL Phase Diff

Exposure/metering
- Exposure modes: ESP multi-pattern, Center-Weighted, Spot, Highlight based spot, Shadow based spot

Shutter
- Shutter speed range: 60 s – 1/4000 s
- Continuous shooting: 3.5 frame/s

Viewfinder
- Viewfinder: Optical TTL

General
- LCD screen: 2.7" TFT LCD, 230,000 pixels, live preview capable
- Battery: BLM-1 Lithium-Ion rechargeable
- Weight: 475 g (17 oz) (body only)
- Made in: China

The Olympus E-520 (or Olympus EVOLT E-520 in North America) is a 10 megapixel digital single-lens reflex (DSLR) camera.

== Features ==
Announced in May 2008 to succeed the E-510, The E-520 adds face detection technology, auto focus live preview, wireless flash capability and shadow adjustment technology. It also features a slightly larger LCD screen designed to improve contrast and give a wider angle of viewing and a faster continuous shooting speed.

The E-520 body and lens mount conform to the "Four Thirds System" standard, providing compatibility with other lenses for that system.

The E-520 uses Olympus' Supersonic Wave Filter dust reduction system to shake dust from the sensor during startup and when requested by the user. This system largely eliminates the problem of dust accumulation on the surface of the image sensor.

The E-520 cannot recharge the battery via USB

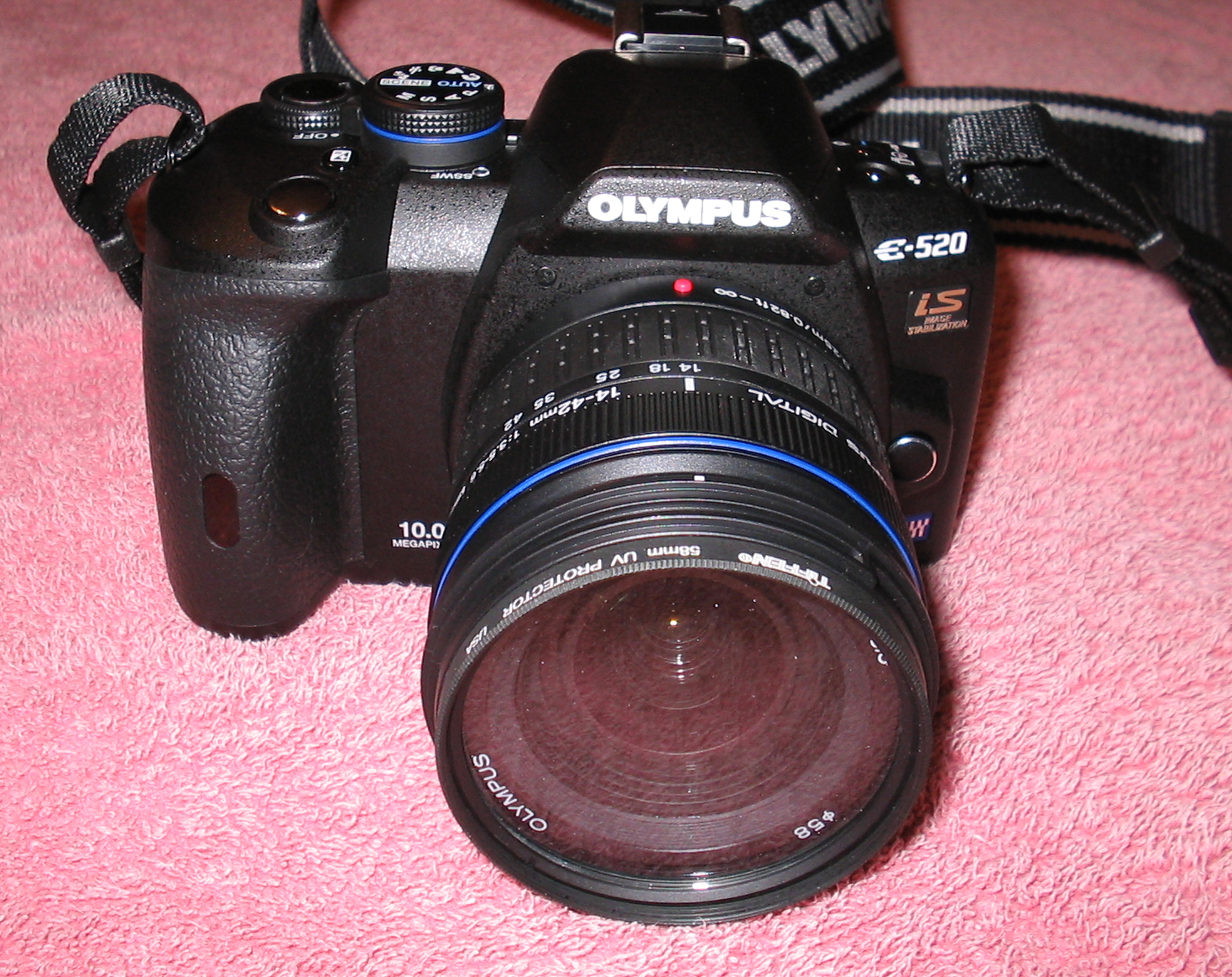
front

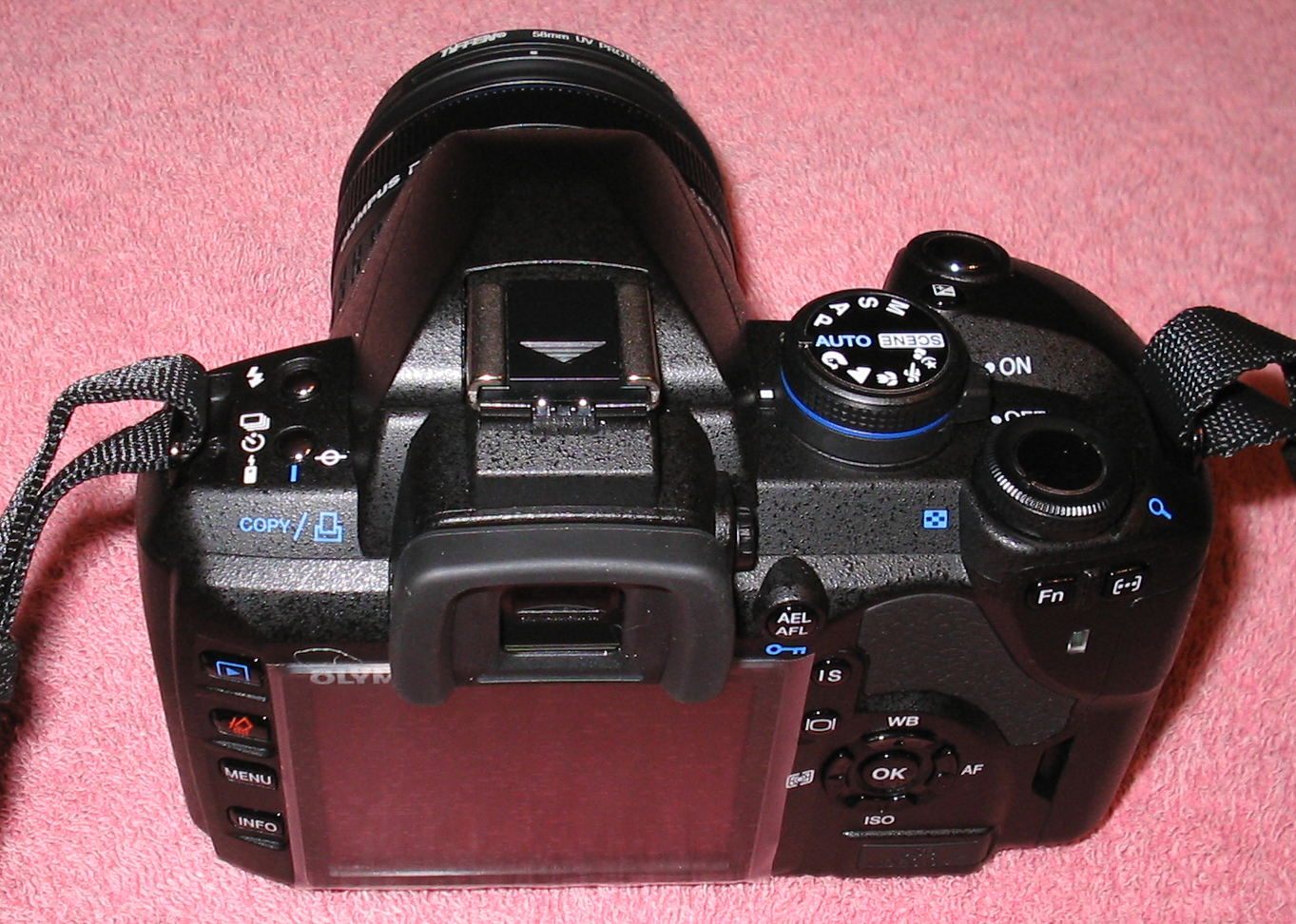
back

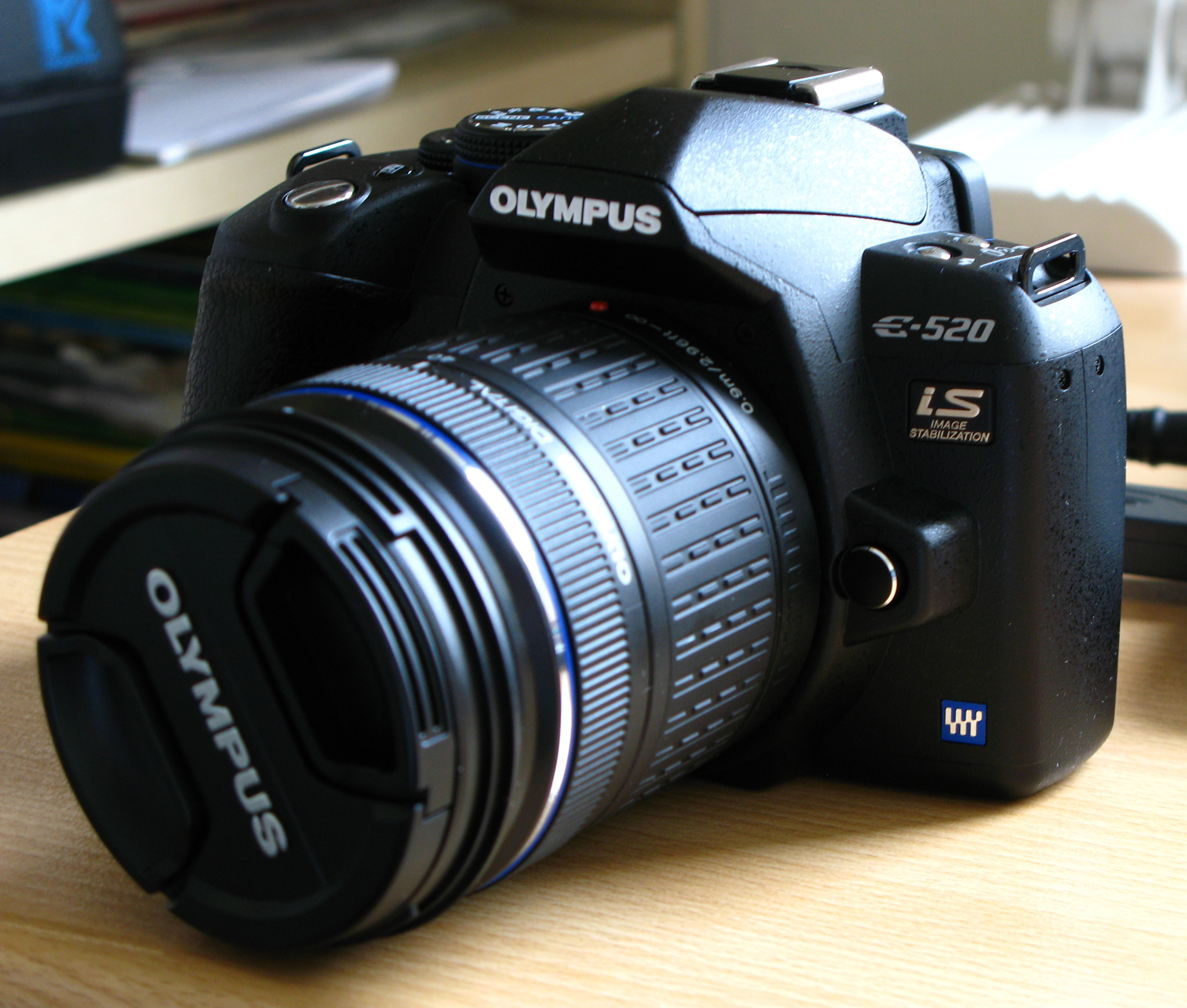
E-520 with Zuiko 40-150 zoom lens

	2003	2004	2005	2006	2007	2008	2009	2010	2011	2012	2013
Flagship		E-1				E-3			E-5		
High-end							E-30				
Midrange							E-620				
Midrange								E-600			
Midrange				E-500	E-510		E-520				
Entry-level			E-300	E-330			E-450				
Entry-level				E-400	E-410		E-420				
