= Zuiko =

Japanese brand of optical lenses

Zuiko (Japanese: ズイコー or 瑞光) is a brand of optical lenses made by OM System and previously Olympus Corporation used in the Micro Four Thirds and Four Thirds system. The name Zuiko (瑞光) means 'Holy Light', using a character from the Mizuho Optic Research Laboratory (瑞穂光学研究所), where the lens was developed, and a character from Takachiho Corporation (高千穂製作所), which would eventually become the Olympus Corporation.

With the introduction of the Micro Four Thirds system in 2008, new lenses for that system started to be branded as M.Zuiko Digital.

== Optical formula nomenclature ==
Four single-coated Zuiko-branded lenses manufactured by Olympus for its OM system

For lenses manufactured until approximately 1972, the number of optical elements of the lens, angle of view, and diaphragm operation could be distinguished by the markings engraved on the lens. The engraving dropped the number of elements with the advent of multicoating, which occurred during the production of OM system lenses. Ace, Pen-F, FTL, and early OM system lenses carry the letter prefix denoting the number of optical elements. Later OM system lenses (generally all multicoated) omitted this prefix.

Zuiko features and optical construction
Prefix (Note: Applied to single-coated prime lenses only.)	# of elements (Note: Provides the number of optical elements in the lens' design.)	Optics	Aperture diaphragm	Angle of view
A.	1	Zuiko (brand)	Auto- (automatic)	W (wide-angle)
B.	2	Zuiko (brand)	Auto- (automatic)	W (wide-angle)
C.	3	Zuiko (brand)	Auto- (automatic)	W (wide-angle)
D.	4	Zuiko (brand)	Auto- (automatic)	W (wide-angle)
E.	5	Zuiko (brand)	Auto- (automatic)	S (standard)
F.	6	Zuiko (brand)	Auto- (automatic)	S (standard)
G.	7	Zuiko (brand)	none (manual)	S (standard)
H.	8	Zuiko (brand)	none (manual)	S (standard)
I.	9	Zuiko (brand)	none (manual)	T (telephoto)
J.	10	Zuiko (brand)	none (manual)	T (telephoto)
K.	11	Zuiko (brand)	none (manual)	T (telephoto)
L.	12	Zuiko (brand)	none (manual)	T (telephoto)

Notes

For example, an "Olympus OM-SYSTEM G.Zuiko Auto-S 1:1.4 f=50 mm" is a lens with a 'Standard' focal length and a maximum aperture of f/1.4 featuring a seven-element construction and an automatic diaphragm, built for the OM-system. The use of 'standard' refers to the focal length compared to the diagonal dimension of the imager; in this case 50 mm is approximately the diagonal dimension of the 35 mm film frame. 'Wide-angle' lenses have focal length significantly shorter than the diagonal dimension, while 'Telephoto' lenses have focal length significantly greater than the diagonal dimension.

== Fixed-lens cameras ==
=== Medium format cameras ===
The first 'Zuiko'-branded lens was a 75 mm f/4.5 lens fitted to the Semi-Olympus I of 1936. The Semi-Olympus used a Semi-Proud body, which took pictures in the 6×4.5 frame using medium format film.

The Olympus Flex I was a twin-lens reflex camera first sold in 1952.

=== Early 35 mm cameras ===
Early 35 mm fixed-lens camera lenses
Lens	Construction	Cameras fitted
35 mm f/2.0	8e/6g	Wide-S (Tower 20)
35 mm f/3.5	4e/3g (Tessar)	Wide, Wide-E (Tower 54), Wide II
40 mm f/3.5	4e/3g (Tessar)	35 I, III, IV, V, S, K (Tower 56)
42 mm f/1.8	7e/5g (Double Gauss)	35 S-II (Tower 18)
42 mm f/2.0	?	35 S-II
45 mm f/1.9	7e/?g	35 S
48 mm f/2.8	5e/4g	35 S, S-II (Tower 10)

In 1948, Olympus marketed the first 35 mm camera in Japan, the Olympus 35 I. It was a viewfinder camera using a 24×32 mm frame size fitted with a fixed (non-interchangeable) 'Zuiko Coated' 40 mm f/3.5 lens; that same lens was also used on the subsequent 35 III (released in 1949 and changed the frame size to the standard 24×36 mm), IV (IV in 1949, IVa in 1953, and IVb in 1954), and V (Va and Vb, both in 1955). Starting with the IV series, the lens dropped 'Coated' in favor of 'F.C.' (fully coated), in both cases referring to the anti-reflective coating.

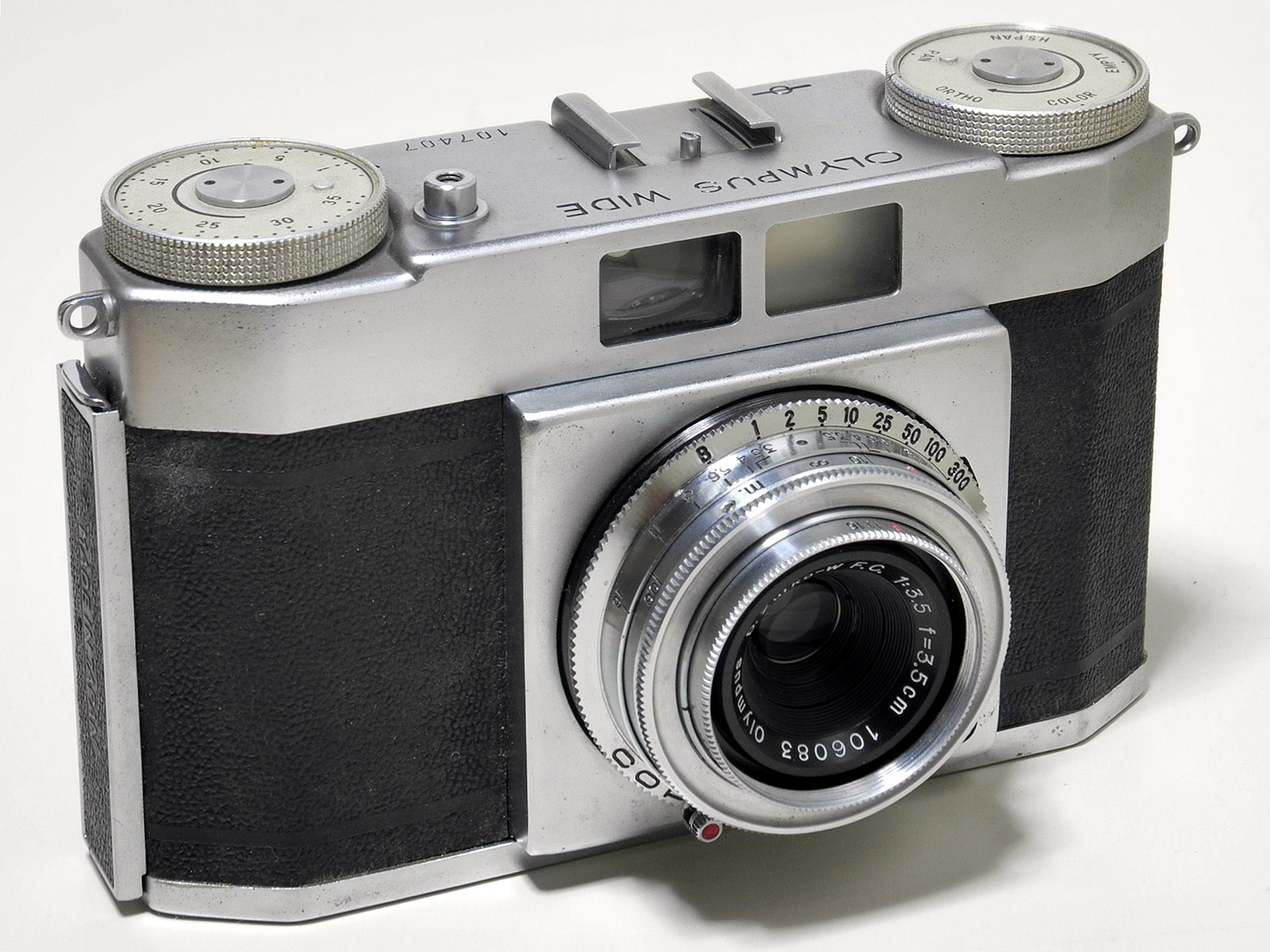
1955 Olympus Wide

Using a chassis similar to the 35 V, Olympus also released the Olympus Wide in 1955, a viewfinder camera featuring the D.Zuiko-W 35 mm f/3.5 wide-angle lens. A version of the Wide using the same lens was produced in 1957 with an integral uncoupled meter, branded the Wide-E. The Wide-E was sold in the United States as the Sears Tower 54. In 1958, the Wide II viewfinder camera replaced the Wide with no change to the lens.

Olympus also began selling the Olympus 35 S rangefinder in 1955, alongside the Olympus 35 Vb viewfinder which had been launched that same year. The initial version of the 35 S used the same 'normal' lens as the preceding viewfinder cameras, now branded D.Zuiko 1:3.5 f=4.0 cm, but Olympus quickly released versions of the same body with faster non-interchangeable lenses, including an E.Zuiko 48 mm f/2.8 and a G.Zuiko 45 mm f/1.9 (released in 1956). The slowest 35 S with the 40 mm f/3.5 lens was replaced by the 35 K in 1957. The 35 K was also sold by Sears as the Tower 56.

The first Olympus 35 mm rangefinder camera with a wide-angle lens was the Wide-S (or Wide Super) of 1957. Lens speed was increased by almost two stops compared to the Wide and Wide-E with the H.Zuiko-W 35 mm f/2.0 fitted to the Wide-S. The Wide-S was also sold by Sears as the Tower 20.

The Olympus 35 S-II replaced the 35 S in 1957 using a body similar to the Wide-S with a choice of two lenses, a faster G.Zuiko 42 mm f/1.8 and a slower E.Zuiko 48 mm f/2.8 carried over from the 35 S. The faster lens was later replaced by a Zuiko 42 mm f/2.0. The 35 S-II was also marketed in the United States by Sears as the Tower 10 (with the 48 mm f/2.8) and the Tower 18 (with the 42 mm f/1.8).

=== Automated exposure 35 mm cameras ===
Autoexposure 35 mm fixed-lens camera lenses
Lens	Construction	Cameras fitted
38 mm f/2.8	4e/3g	35 ED
40 mm f/1.7	6e/4g	35 DC, RD
40 mm f/2.8	4e/3g	Trip 35
42 mm f/1.7	7e/5g	35 LE, LC, SP, SPn, UC
42 mm f/1.8	7e/5g	Auto, S Electro Set, SC
42 mm f/2.8	5e/4g	Auto-B, 35 EC, EC 2, ECR, RC
43 mm f/2.5	4e/3g (Tessar)	Auto Eye II
45 mm f/2.8	4e/3g (Tessar)	Auto Eye

Olympus released the Olympus-Auto electro-set (1958) and Auto-B electro-set (1959) shortly after the Ace interchangeable lens rangefinder, using styling largely borrowed from the Ace. Both of the Auto models had built-in exposure meters, and were distinguished by lens speed; the older Auto had the faster G.Zuiko 42 mm f/1.8 lens carried over from the 35 S-II and the Auto-B had a slower E.Zuiko 42 mm f/2.8 lens. Cosmetically, the Auto had a cover for the meter window, which was omitted on the Auto-B. The 'electro-set' designates the semi-automated exposure system; by setting the film speed on the camera body, match-needle metering is used to set aperture and shutter speed simultaneously. The aperture and shutter speed settings are coaxial with the lens and are geared to turn together when the shutter speed is changed; the aperture may be varied, but the shutter speed will change with aperture to maintain exposure. The Auto Eye of 1960 succeeded the older electro-set models and added full shutter-priority autoexposure using a non-interchangeable version of the D.Zuiko 45 mm f/2.8 from the Ace. The camera will not release the shutter if the correct exposure cannot be set based on the selected shutter speed. A slightly faster D.Zuiko 43 mm f/2.5 was used for its successor, the Auto Eye II, released in 1962.

Also in 1962, Olympus released the S Electro Set (engraved with 'Olympus-S' on the top plate), which used the G.Zuiko 42 mm f/1.8 lens from the original Auto. An updated version designated SC was released in 1963; it retained the 'Olympus-S' top plate engraving using the same lens but switched the meter technology from selenium cell to cadmium sulfide (CdS). The successor of the Olympus-S twins was the first of the two-letter 35 xx models, released in 1965; the Olympus 35 LE used a slightly faster G.Zuiko 42 mm f/1.7 lens with similar double Gauss optical construction and prominently advertised the use of six transistors. A similarly styled 35 LC using the same lens was released in 1967, which dropped the autoexposure functions of the 35 LE. Like the older electro-set models, the 35 LC coupled the shutter speed and aperture rings so that once the exposure was set, changing the shutter speed would also automatically change the aperture.

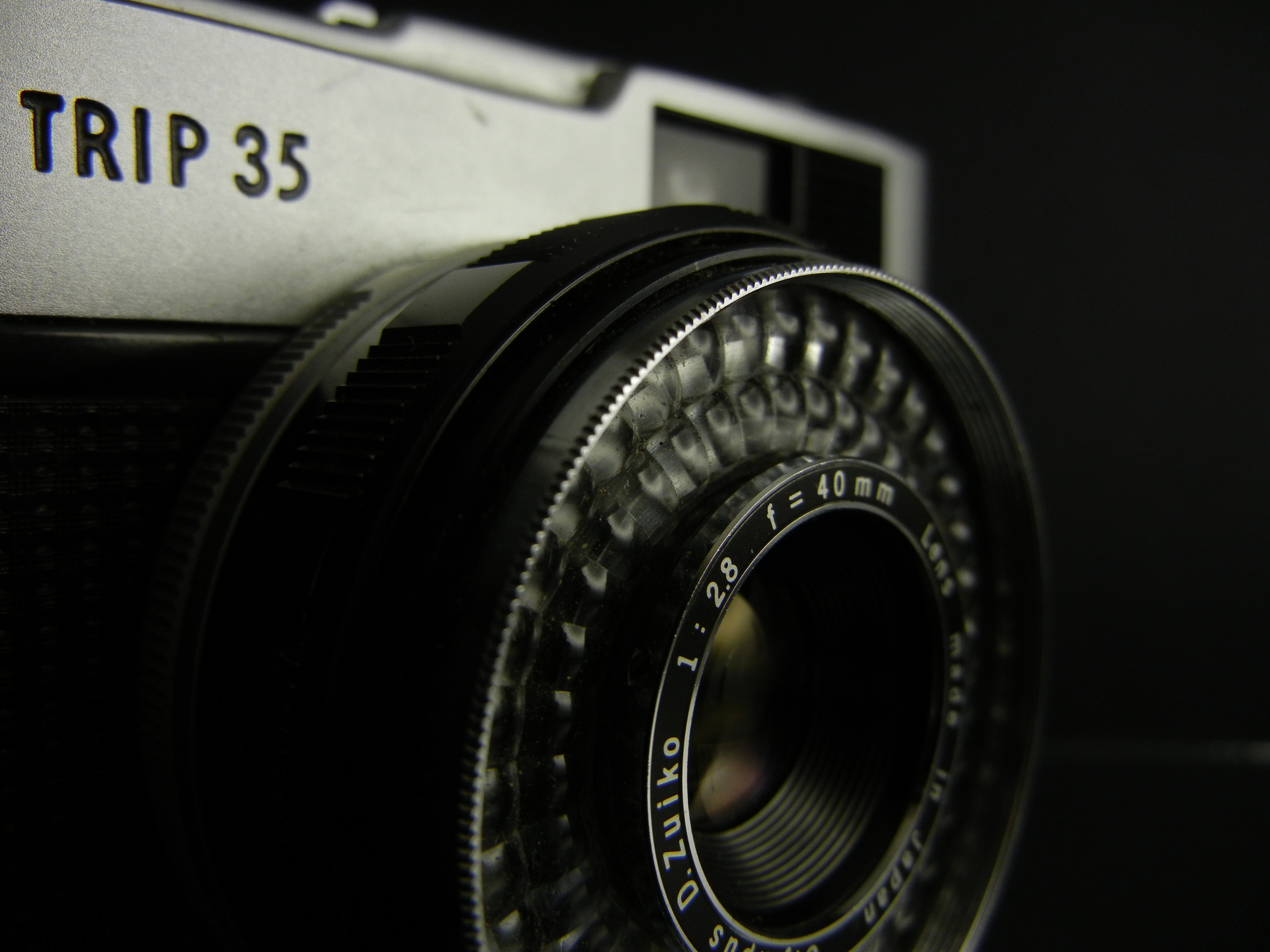
1968 Olympus Trip 35, D.Zuiko 40 mm f/2.8

Between 1968 and 1983, Olympus sold the Trip 35 camera. It was a scale/zone-focused camera based on the Pen EES which featured a D.Zuiko 40 mm f/2.8 Tessar-type lens, two automatically selected shutter speeds (1/40, which doubled as the manual flash sync speed, and 1/200) for aperture-priority autoexposure, or programmed autoexposure driven by the selenium cell meter. No batteries were required. It was marketed as a kit with a compact flash.

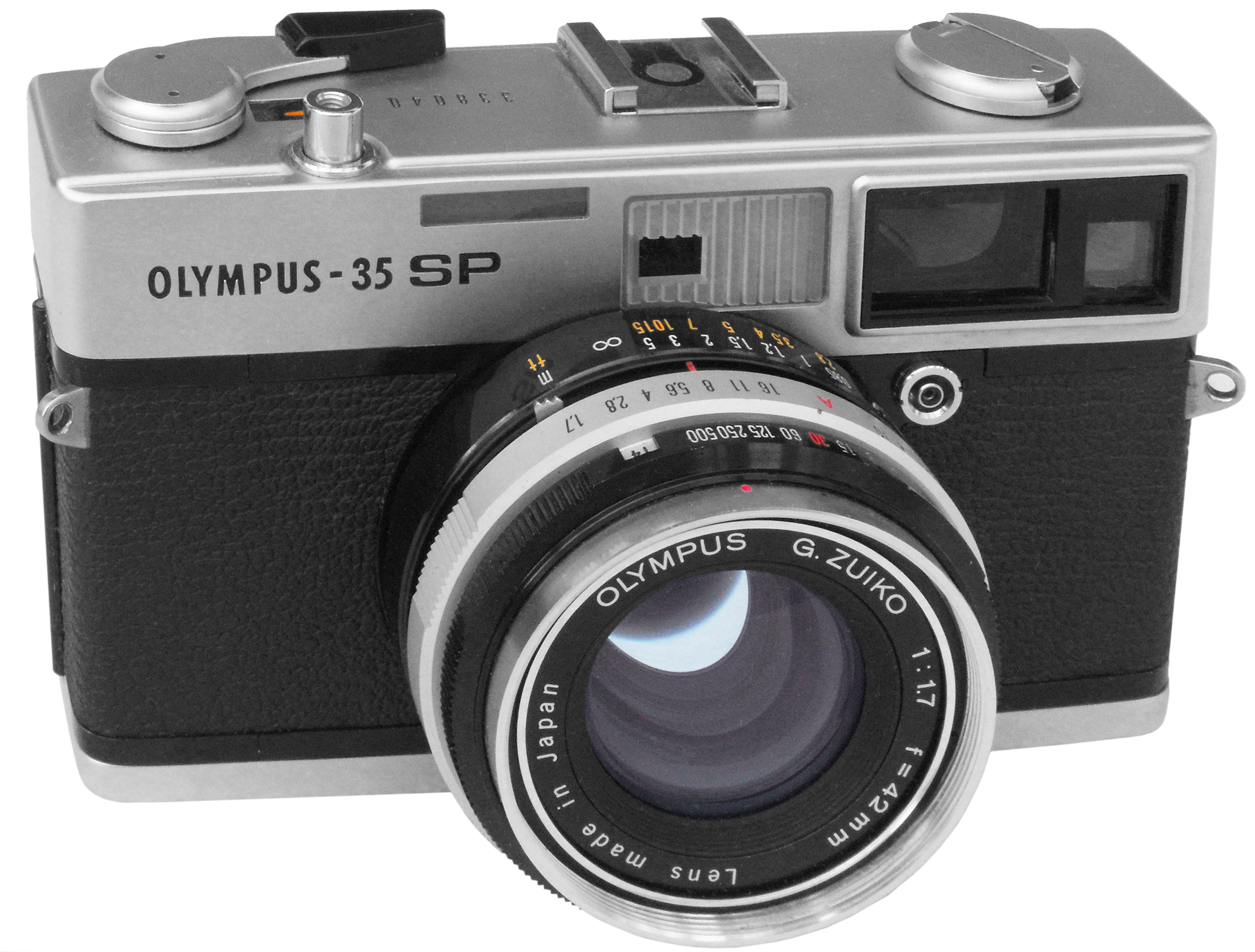
1969 Olympus 35 SP, G.Zuiko 42 mm f/1.7

The 35 LE/LC were followed by the flagship fixed-lens 35 SP rangefinder of 1969, again using the G.Zuiko 42 mm f/1.7 lens. The 35 SP featured both manual and programmed automatic exposure modes, where the meter reading automatically set both aperture and shutter speed. A switch on the back of the 35 SP engaged the spot meter to override the default scene-average metering. An updated 35 SPN added a battery check in 1972, but otherwise kept the same features and lens as the 35 SP. The camera was restyled and was re-released as the 35 UC in 1973.

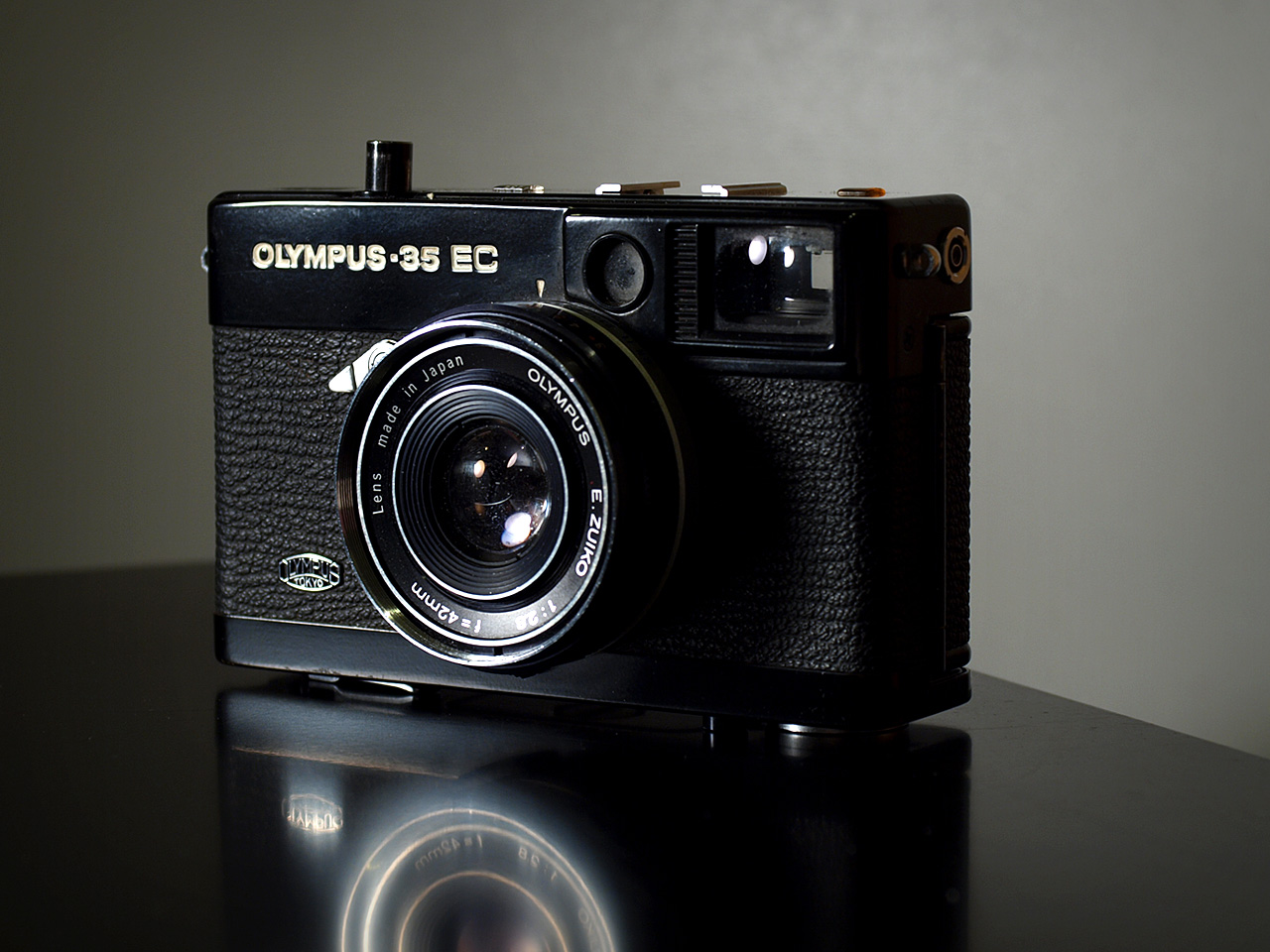
1969 Olympus 35 EC, E.Zuiko 42 mm f/2.8

Meanwhile, Olympus released the 35 EC economy fixed-lens camera alongside the 35 SP in 1969; compared to the SP, the EC had a slower E.Zuiko 42 mm f/2.8 lens carried over from the Auto-B of 1959, but was also markedly smaller and lighter. The 35 EC offered programmed automatic exposure only (both aperture and shutter speed set automatically by the meter) and had no rangefinder. The 35 EC was replaced in 1971 by the 35 EC2, which added a battery check function. The updated 35 ECR of 1972 added a rangefinder to the 35 EC2 but again was limited to programmed autoexposure. In 1974, Olympus released the 35 ED, last of the 'economy' line, equipped with a slightly wider D.Zuiko 38 mm f/2.8 lens, rangefinder focusing, and programmed autoexposure only.

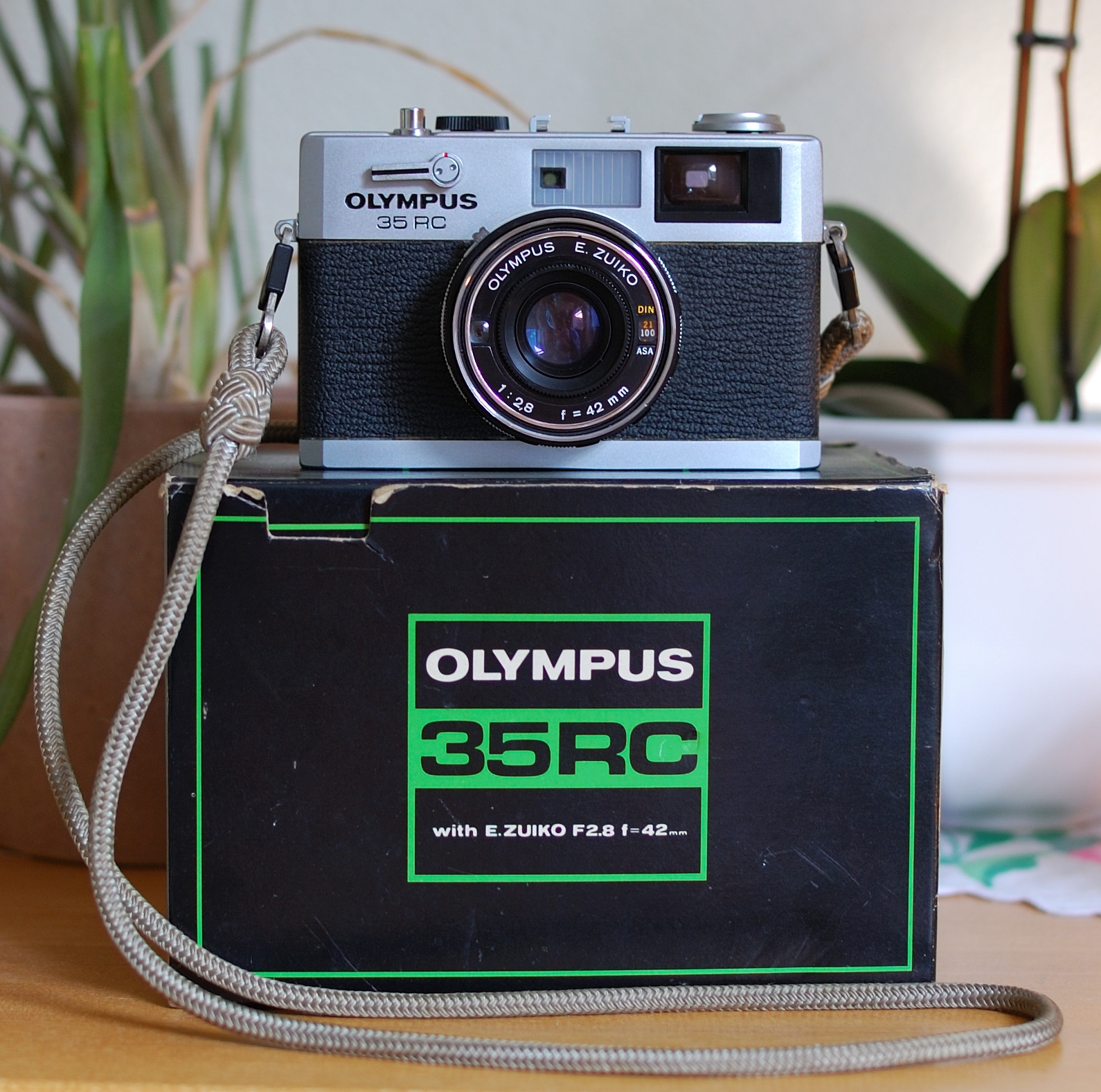
1970 Olympus 35 RC compact, E.Zuiko 42 mm f/2.8

In 1970, Olympus marketed the 35 RC as a mid-range compromise; although it was approximately the same size as the 35 EC using the same E.Zuiko 42 mm f/2.8 lens, the 35 RC added more advanced features from the 35 SP including true rangefinder focusing and the option of either shutter-priority autoexposure or manual exposure control. The 35 DC ("Deluxe Compact") of 1971 also offered rangefinder focusing of a faster F.Zuiko 40 mm f/1.7 lens, but was limited to programmed autoexposure only. The 35 DC was equipped with a backlight exposure compensation to increase exposure by 1.5 stops by depressing a button, a simpler solution than the spot meter of the 35 SP. Finally, in 1975, Olympus released the 35 RD, combining the faster F.Zuiko 40 mm f/1.7 lens from the 35 DC with the shutter-priority autoexposure or manual exposure controls of the older 35 RC. However, the 35 RD omitted the backlight compensation button of the 35 DC.

=== Pen fixed-lens half-frame cameras ===
Pen 35 mm fixed-lens half-frame camera lenses
Lens	Construction	Cameras fitted
25 mm f/2.8	5e/?g	Pen-W
28 mm f/3.5	4e/3g (Tessar)	Pen, EE, EE-2, EE-3, EF
30 mm f/2.8	4e/3g (Tessar)	Pen-S, EE-S, Rapid EES, EES-2
32 mm f/1.7	6e/4g	Pen-D3, EED, Rapid EED
32 mm f/1.9	6e/4g	Pen-D, D2
35 mm f/2.0	6e/4?g	Pen-EM

Yoshihisa Maitani, who had joined Olympus in 1956, is credited as the father of the Pen half-frame camera line. Maitani had a keen interest in photography, but felt the cost of cameras was a barrier to entry, as the cheapest camera Olympus sold in 1958 cost ¥23,000 (equivalent to ¥148,000 in 2024), approximately 1 1/2× the average monthly salary of a new worker. He proposed to develop a camera that could be sold for ¥6,000 (equivalent to ¥39,000 in 2024) instead.

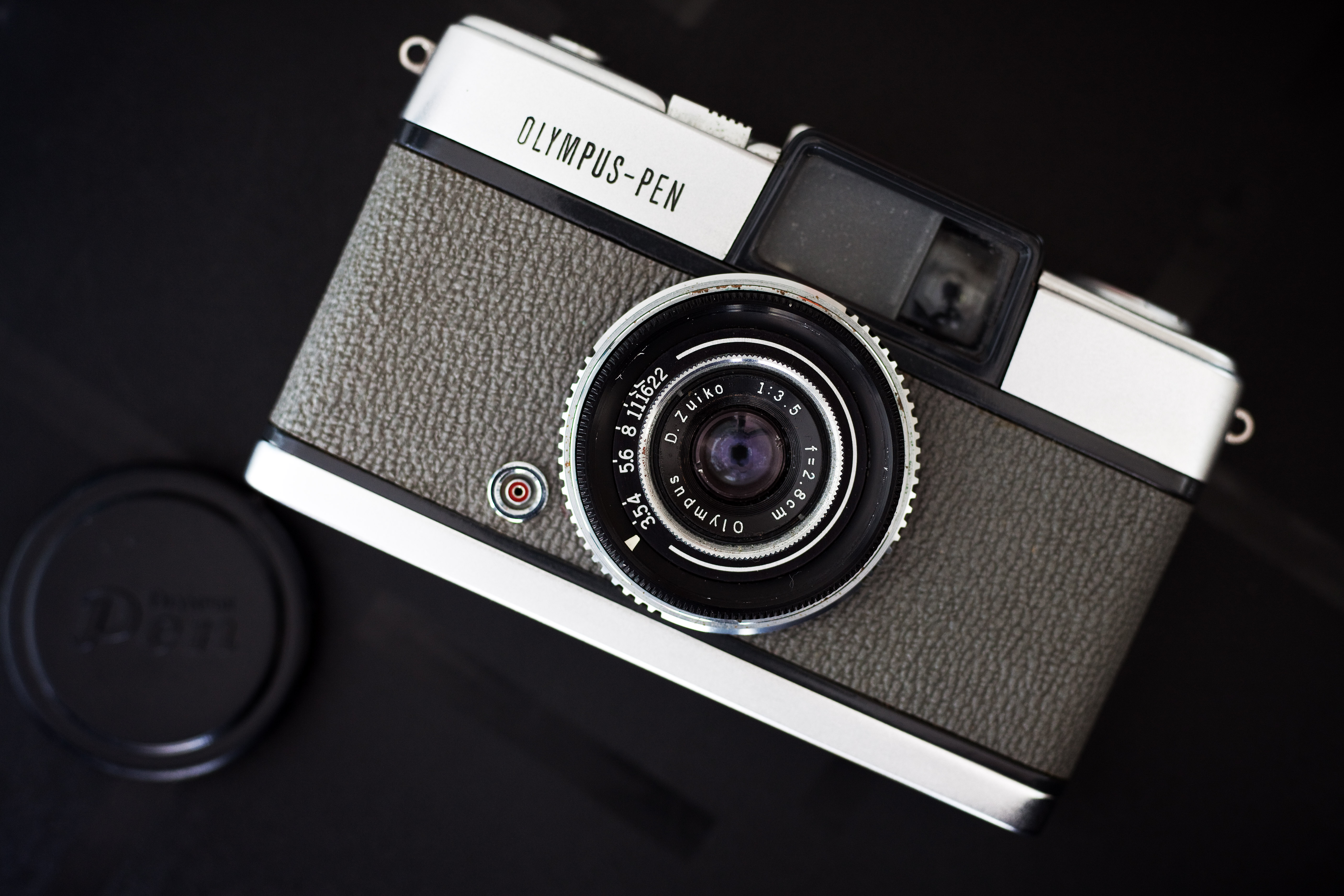
1959 Olympus Pen, D.Zuiko 28 mm f/3.5

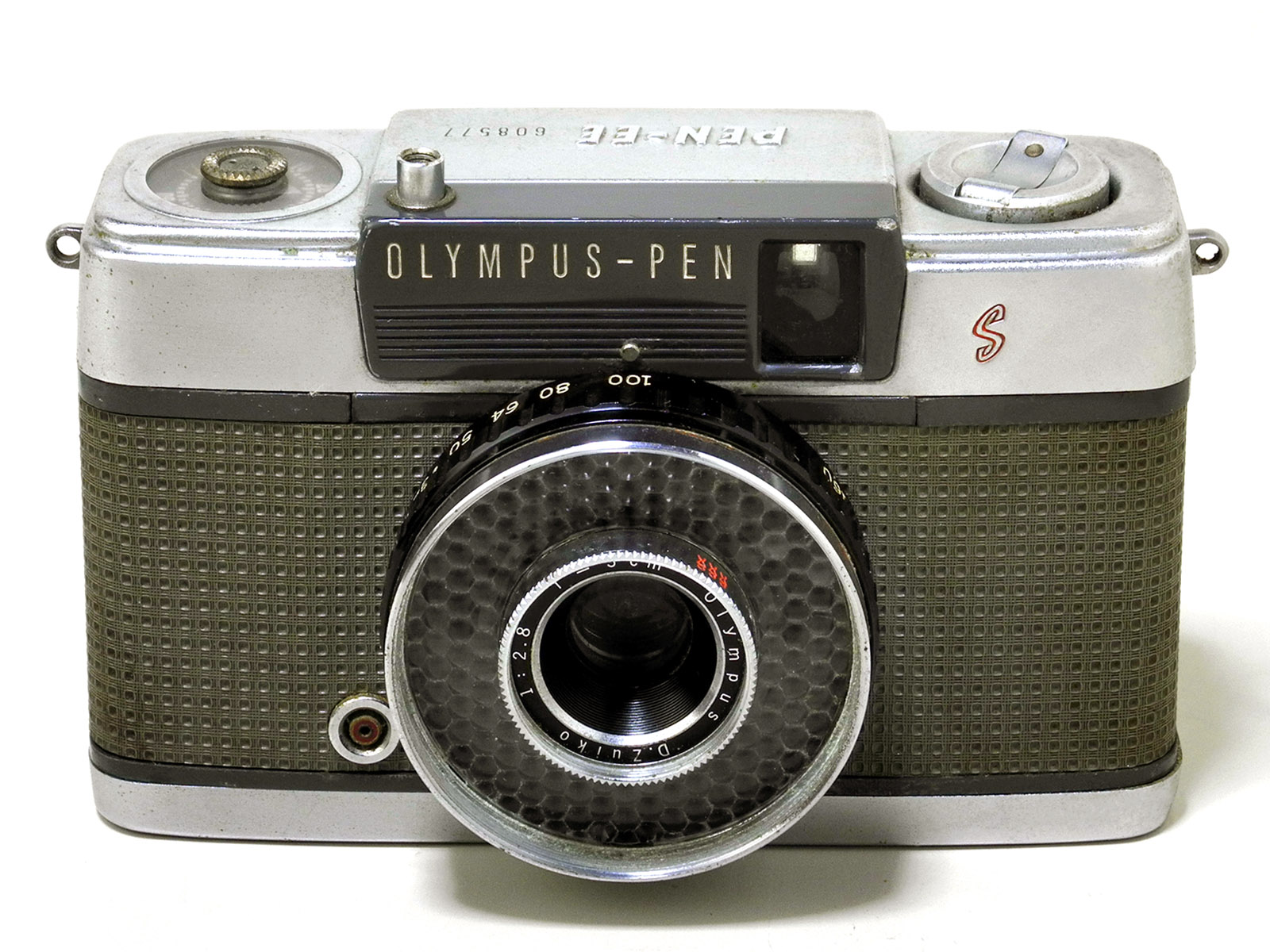
1962 Olympus Pen EE-S, D.Zuiko 30 mm f/2.8

During the development of what became the Pen half-frame camera, released in 1959, Maitani challenged the lens design department to construct a Tessar-type lens as good as one from Leica, resulting in the D.Zuiko 28 mm f/3.5; the lens was designed without regard to cost and ended up consuming the entire development budget. The Pen featured simplified mechanisms where possible to control costs, as a result. The prototype camera delighted the head of Olympus, Eiichi Sakurai, who wanted to put the camera into production immediately; however, the head of Olympus's factory flatly refused to produce the "toy camera" and production was initially outsourced. The best-selling camera for Olympus at the time was the Wide, which was selling just over 1,000 units per month; once the Pen went on sale, Olympus had to ramp up production of the Pen to more than 5,000 units per month.

Olympus introduced the Pen-S in 1960, featuring a slightly faster D.Zuiko 30 mm f/2.8 lens. In 1961, a programmed autoexposure variant of the original Pen was released, the Pen-EE, equipped with the original D.Zuiko 28 mm f/3.5 lens and a selenium cell meter. The Pen-EE S of 1962 combined the faster Pen-S D.Zuiko 30 mm f/2.8 lens with the meter and autoexposure of the original Pen-EE. A second Pen-S with the original Pen's slower D.Zuiko 28 mm f/3.5 lens was released in 1964, alongside a wide-angle variant, the Pen-W, equipped with an E.Zuiko 25 mm f/2.8 lens. The two Pen-EE and EE S models gained 'EL' (Easy Load) variants in 1966 with a new six-slot film take-up spool.

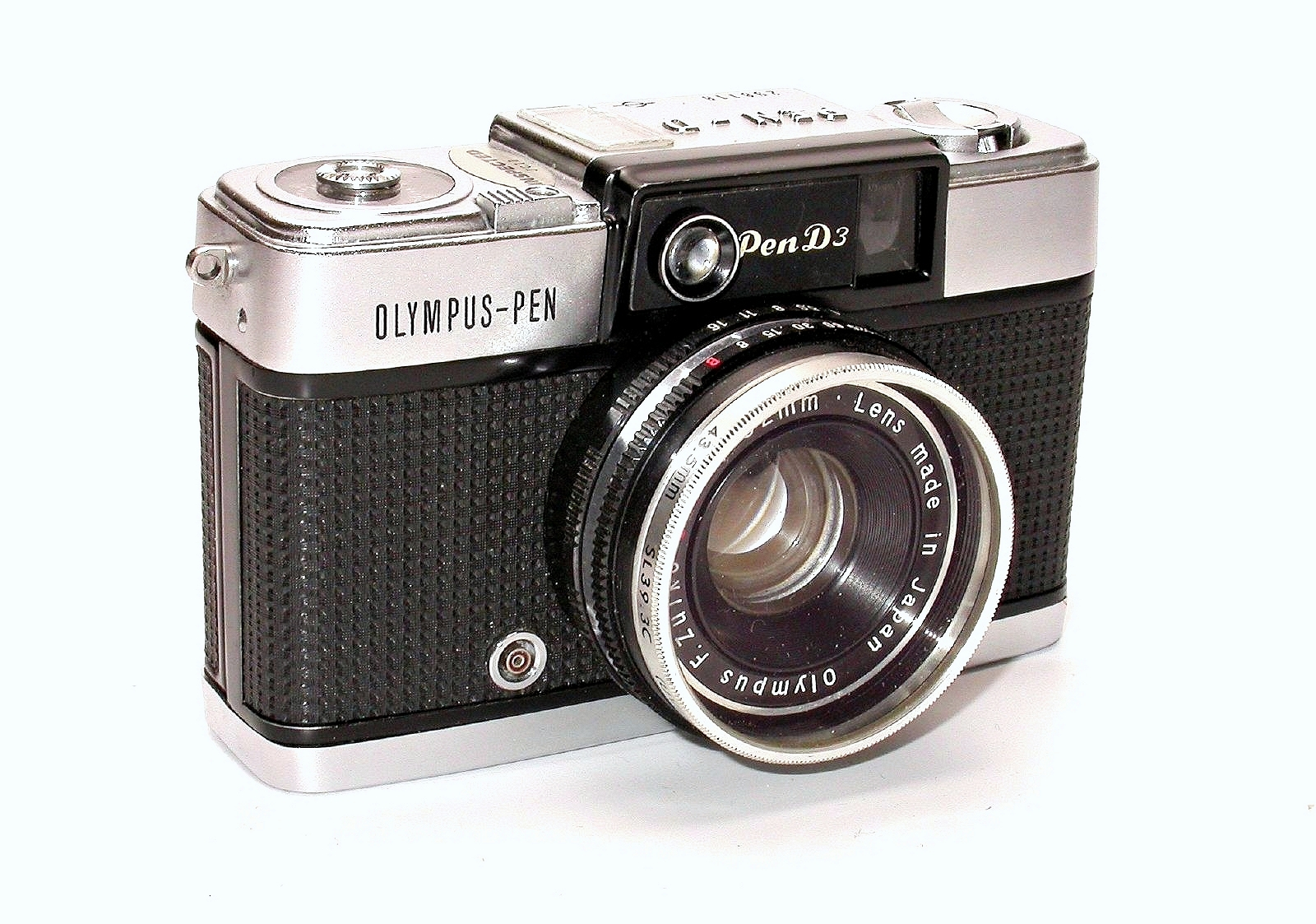
1965 Olympus Pen-D3, F.Zuiko 32 mm f/1.7

Also in 1962, the more advanced Pen-D was released, featuring a significantly faster F.Zuiko 32 mm f/1.9 lens and an uncoupled selenium meter, whose readings were manually transferred to set exposure. The Pen-D2 of 1964 was a Pen-D equipped with a new CdS metering cell. The 1965 Pen-D3 increased lens speed again, using a F.Zuiko 32 mm f/1.7, and a Pen-D3 EL variant was introduced in 1966.

By 1963, the Pen system was so well-accepted that Olympus had released a porroprism SLR, the Pen-F, with its own extensive system of interchangeable lenses.

1965 brought the Pen EM equipped with a F.Zuiko 35 mm f/2.0 lens and a motor built into the body. The 1967 Pen EED used the F.Zuiko 32 mm f/1.7 lens from the Pen-D3 and added program and aperture-priority autoexposure. Two Pen camera models were modified to take the Agfa Rapid 35 mm film pack, released first in 1965 as the Pen RAPID EES and the Pen RAPID EED. The Pen-EE models received mainly cosmetic updates with the EES-2 (1968, using the 'S' D.Zuiko 30 mm f/2.8 lens), EE-2 (1968), and EE-3 (1973); both the EE-2 and EE-3 used the older D.Zuiko 28 mm f/3.5 lens with fixed focus. The final Pen fixed-lens camera was the Pen EF, released in 1981; it was an EE-3 with an integrated flash.

=== 126 cartridge camera ===
The Olympus Quickmatic EEM incorporated features from the Pen EM (motor-driven film advance) and Pen-EE (program autoexposure according to the selenium cell "electric eye") in a viewfinder camera using another Tessar variant, the D.Zuiko 36 mm f/2.8. Focus was continuously variable, but had three click-stop "zone" settings. The Quickmatic EEM used the square-format 126 film in cartridges.

=== XA capsule cameras ===
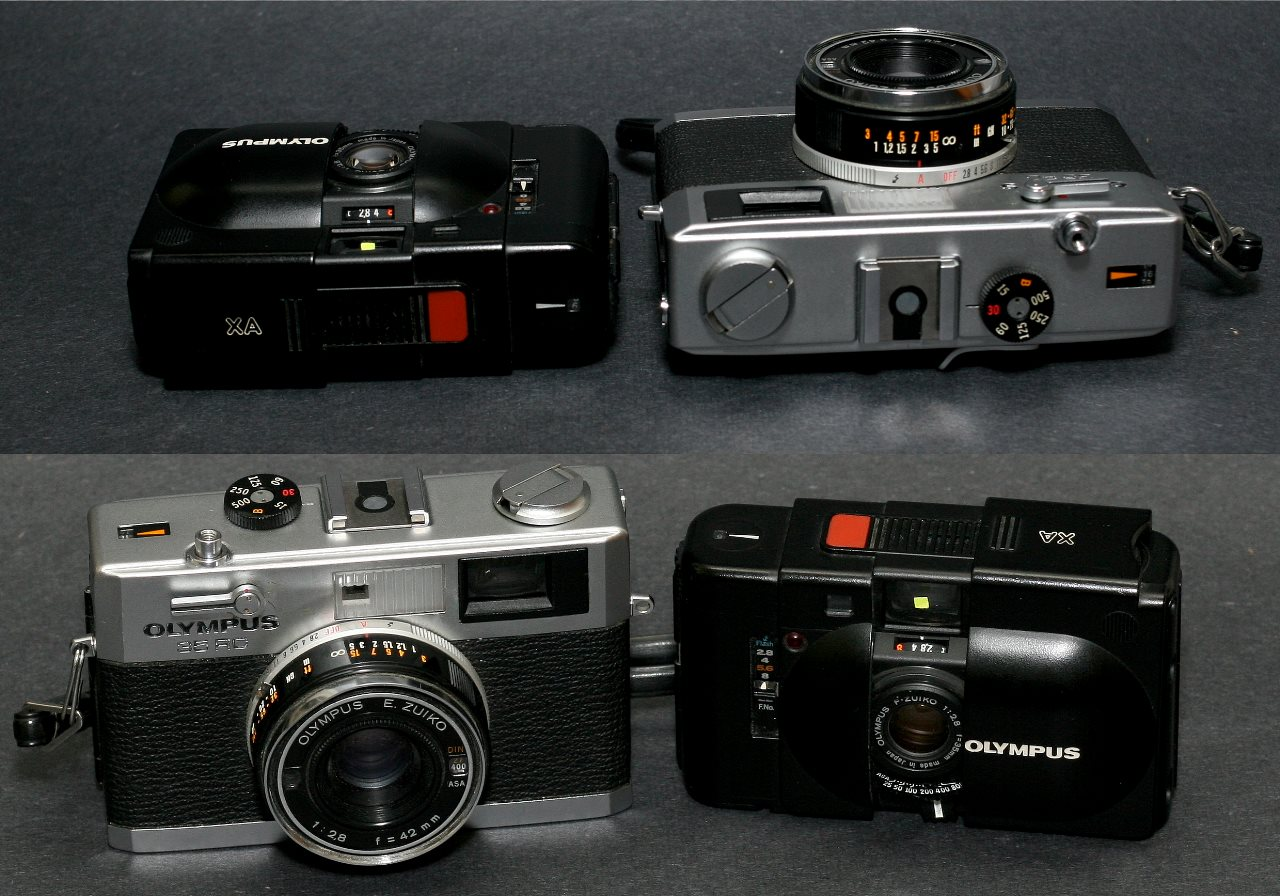
Olympus bracketing the 1970s: 35 RC (1970) and XA (1979)

XA series fixed-lens camera lenses
Lens	Construction	Cameras fitted
28 mm f/3.5	5e/5g	XA4
35 mm f/2.8	6e/4g	XA
35 mm f/3.5	4e/4g	XA2, XA3
35 mm f/4.0	4e/4g	XA1

The 35 xx models were replaced in 1979 by the Olympus XA, which was comparable to the 35 RC and RD in function, but markedly smaller with a sliding lens cover. Shortly after the OM-2 was launched in 1975, Maitani was asked to plan a new compact camera in response to a recent decline in Olympus's market share; at the time, the market share for Olympus 35 mm compact cameras had decreased from 37% to 35%. He formed a team of 10 development engineers and gave them a year to independently conceive a new compact camera; the Konica C35 AF, which was the world's first autofocus camera, had just been released and all of the engineers were enthusiastic about designing a competitor. Maitani rejected that idea ("I told them that if they liked [the Konica C35] I'd buy them one each. That would only cost about 200,000 yen, compared with the hundreds of millions of yen needed for developing a new model.") and still seeing unsatisfactory results from the team, Maitani began to design a new compact camera himself, prioritizing size so that it could be carried everywhere. Based on the dimensions of the 35 mm film cassette, he targeted a final camera size of 105 mm × 65 mm × 30 mm (4.1 in × 2.6 in × 1.2 in) (W×H×D), one that would also not require a case or a lens cap that could be lost. The resulting XA would go on to be the first camera to win the Good Design Award.

The four successive numbered models in the XA series (XA1, XA2, XA3, XA4) largely used the same black metal capless/capsule body design with slower lenses that were zone focused, with the exception of the fixed-focus XA1, which was similar in concept to the Pen EES and Trip 35. The XA4 was able to focus significantly closer and had a wider angle of view than the other cameras in the XA series.

=== Autofocus 35 mm and digital cameras ===
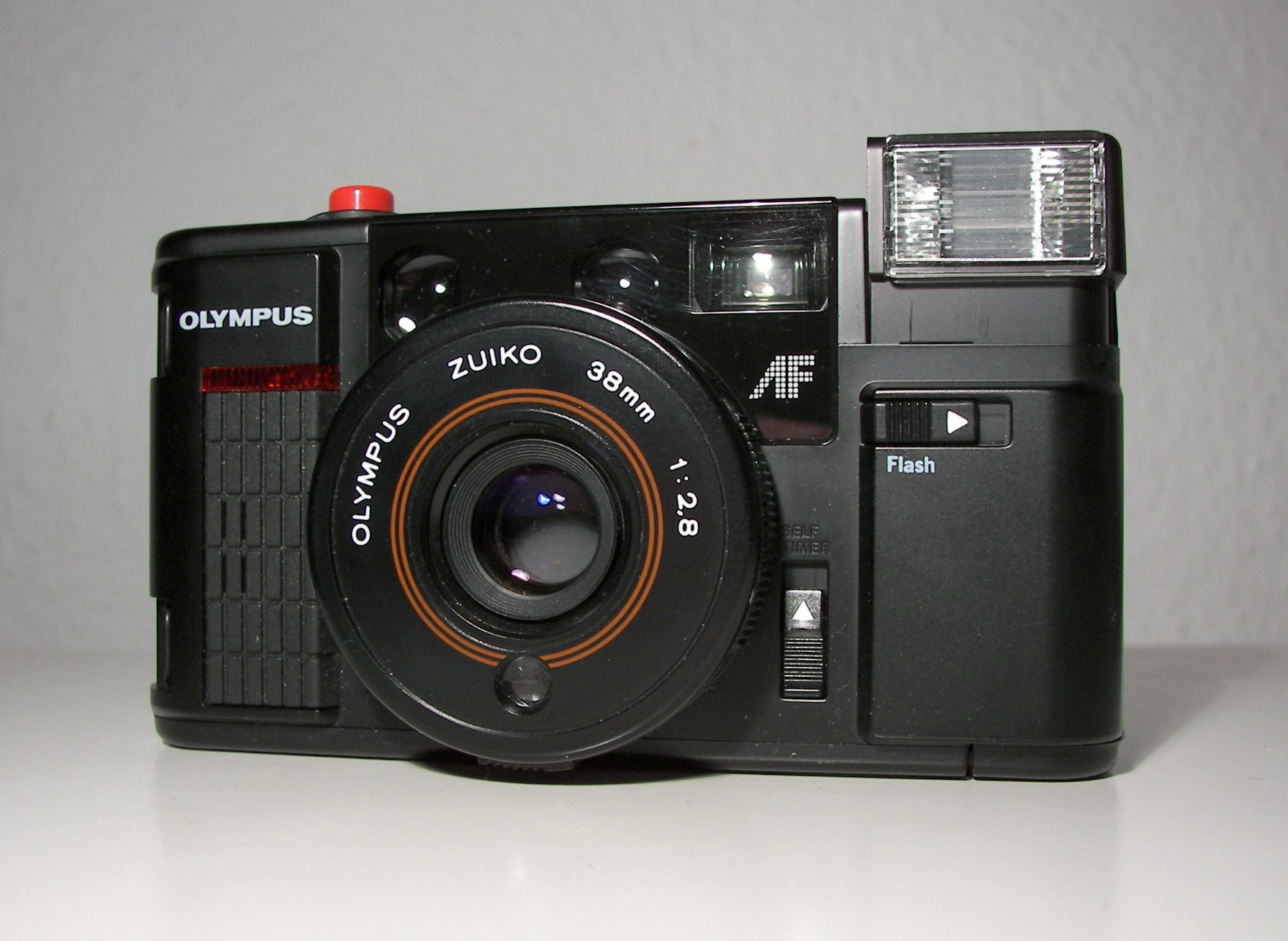
AFL (1983)

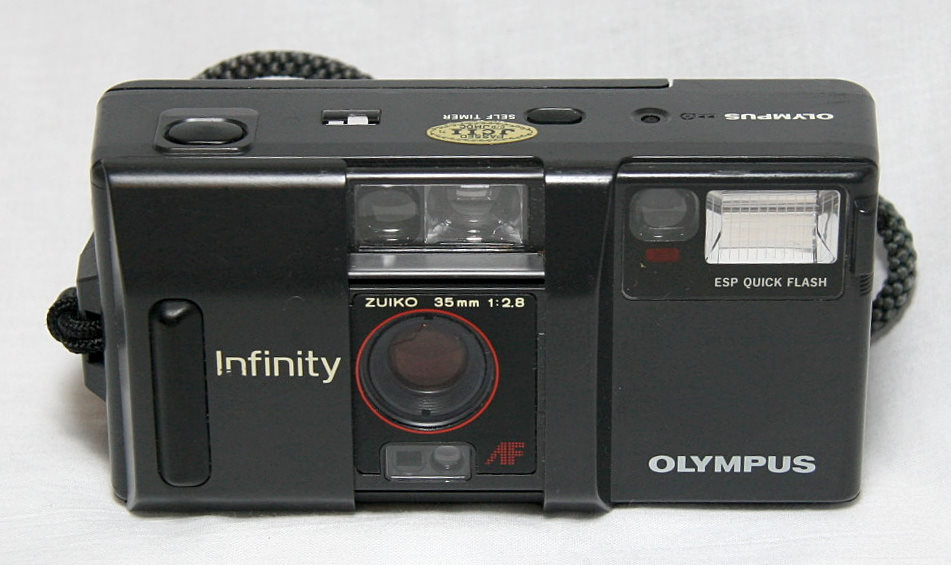
AF-1 (1986)

Early Olympus AF cameras with Zuiko-branded lenses

Olympus dropped the Zuiko branding on its fixed-lens cameras after an initial set of autofocus compact cameras:

- C-AF (1981, D.Zuiko 38 mm f/2.8, jointly developed with Konica, who sold it as the C35 AF2)
- AFL/AFL-S (1983, Zuiko 38 mm f/2.8),
- Trip AF (1984, Zuiko 35 mm f/3.5)
- Trip AF MD (1985, Zuiko 35 mm f/3.8)
- SuperTrip (1986, Zuiko 35 mm f/4)
- AF-1/Infinity (1986, Zuiko 35 mm f/2.8)

The successors to this line, including the mju/Stylus line and subsequent digital fixed-lens cameras, all used "Olympus" branded lenses. The Zuiko name was not revived until 2003, with the release of the E-1 digital SLR and its line of 'Zuiko Digital' branded four-thirds system lenses.

== Interchangeable lenses ==
=== Minor systems ===
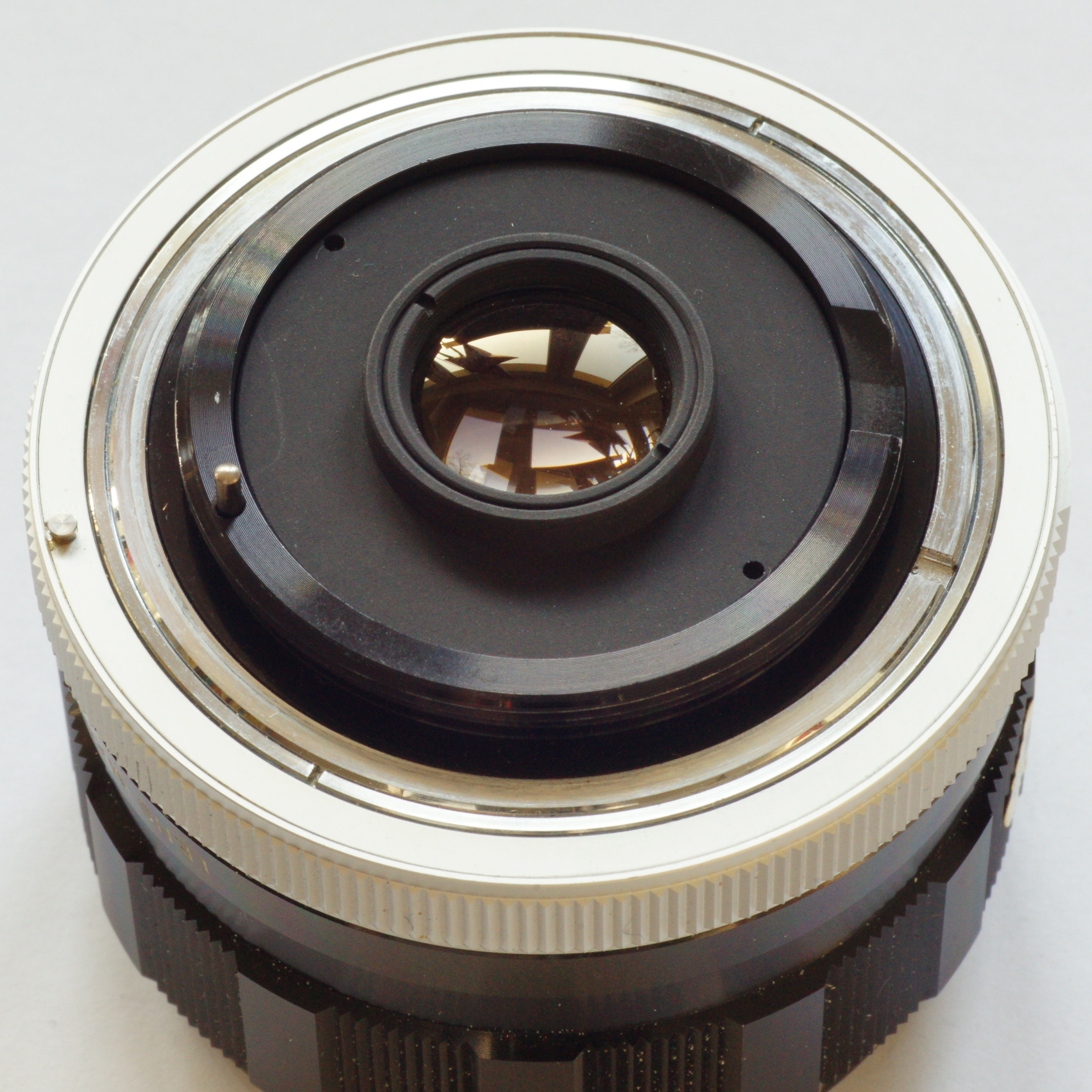
Rear of Olympus M42 lens for FTL

Prior to the lenses built for the Pen-F half-frame camera, Olympus produced the Ace rangefinder camera in 1958. Four Zuiko-branded lenses were sold for the Ace. The Ace was followed up by the Ace-E of 1959, which added a selenium light meter; the Ace-E was rebranded as the Sears Tower 19 for America. Sears also offered two accessory lenses (35 mm f/2.8 and 80 mm f/5.6) for the Tower 19.

Between the Pen-F and the OM system cameras, Olympus manufactured the FTL camera with a M42 lens mount modified to pass aperture information to the camera's internal meter. Olympus offered six lenses with the FTL. Both cameras took 35 mm film, but the lenses are not interchangeable between the two systems.

Zuiko-branded interchangeable lenses for Ace and FTL
	Wide angle	Standard	Telephoto
Ace	35 f/2.8	45 f/2.8	80 f/4; 80 f/5.6
FTL	28 f/3.5; 35 f/2.8	50 f/1.4; 50 f/1.8	135 f/3.5; 200 f/4

=== Pen F lenses ===
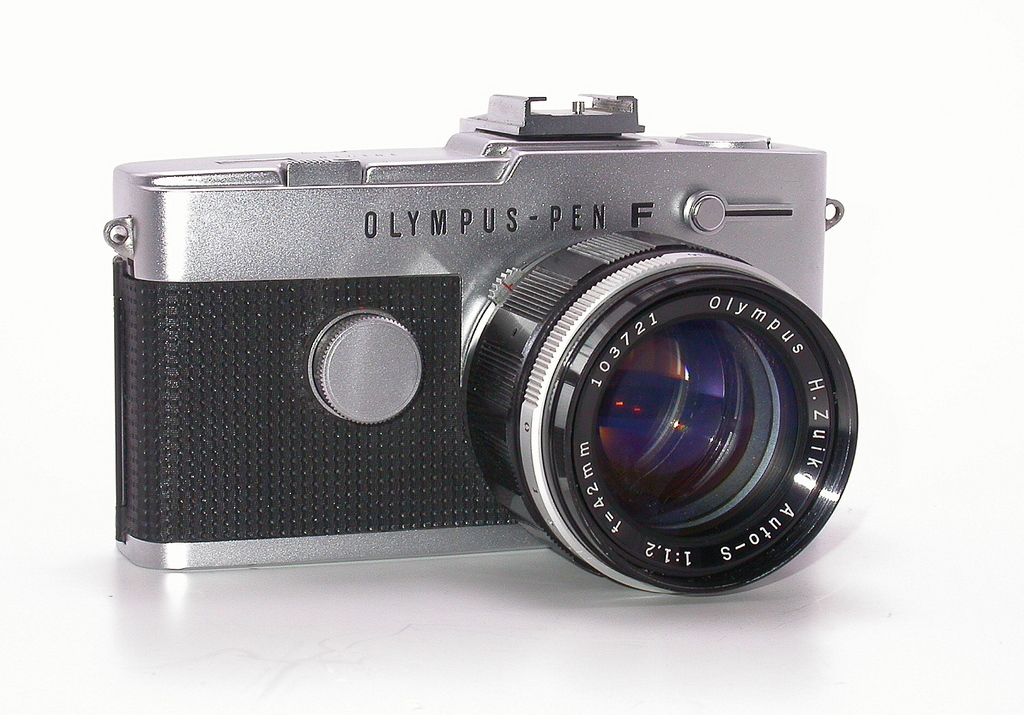
Olympus Pen-FT with 42 mm f/1.2 standard lens

To estimate the angle of view of Pen half-frame system lenses, the native focal length may be multiplied by a factor of 1.4 to obtain the equivalent 35 mm focal length. For example, the 20 mm Pen lens has an angle of view approximately equal to that of a 28 mm lens for 35 mm format cameras.

Zuiko-branded lenses for Pen half-frame cameras
	Wide angle	Standard	Telephoto	Zoom
–	20 f/3.5; 25 f/4; 25 f/2.8	38 f/1.8; 38 f/2.8 'pancake'; 40 f/1.4; 42 f/1.2	60 f/1.5; 70 f/2; 100 f/3.5; 150 f/4; 250 f/5; 400 f/6.3; 800 f/8	50-90 f/3.5; 100-200 f/5

=== OM system lenses ===
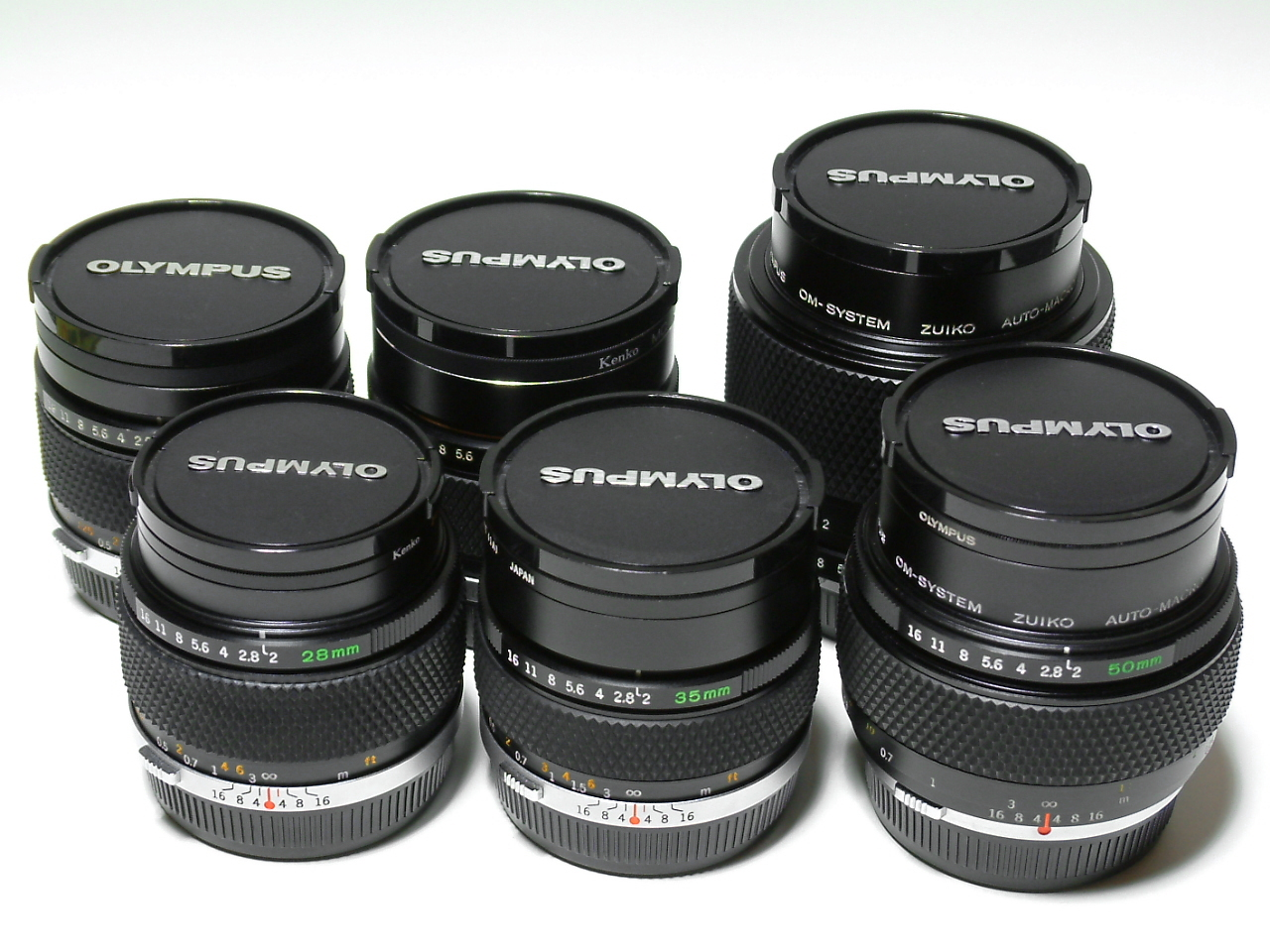
The f/2 series of lenses for OM cameras; from left to right front row: 28/2, 35/2, 50/2 Macro back row: 21/2, 24/2, 90/2 Macro

Early Olympus OM system lenses used single coating. These lenses came in two different cosmetic variants, nicknamed "chrome nose" and "black nose", denoting the color of the filter attachment ring. Some lenses were updated with multicoating during later production. Single-coated lenses are distinguished by carrying a letter prefix ahead of the "Zuiko" (e.g., 'G.Zuiko'), where the letter provides the number of lens elements in the optical design. Multicoated lenses dropped the letter prefix and initially used the "MC" label (i.e., "Zuiko MC Auto") and in later production, dropped both the prefix and the "MC" label (e.g. "Zuiko Auto") altogether.

Zuiko-branded lenses for OM-system cameras
Focal length / application Marketing grade	Wide angle	Standard	Telephoto	Macro	Special-purpose
Compact (49 mm filter)	28-48 f/4; 21 f/3.5; 24 f/2.8; 28 f/2; 28 f/2.8; 28 f/3.5; 35 f/2.8	35-70 f/3.5-4.5; 40 f/2; 50 f/1.2; 50 f/1.4; 50 f/1.8	75-150 f/4; 100-200 f/5; 85 f/2; 100 f/2.8; 135 f/3.5; 200 f/5	50 f/3.5; 80 f/4 (Note: Equipped with OM mount, but no focusing helicoid; requires bellows or 65-116 mm extension tube.) (Note: Early versions had a manual diaphragm.)	16 f/3.5 Fisheye (Note: No filter attachment provided.) (Note: Equipped with built-in filter turret.); 35 f/2.8 Shift
Speed (55 mm filter)	21 f/2; 24 f/2; 35 f/2	35-70 f/3.6; 35-70 f/4; 35-105 f/3.5-4.5; 55 f/1.2	50-250 f/5; 65-200 f/4; 85-250 f/5; 100 f/2; 135 f/2.8; 200 f/4	50 f/2; 90 f/2; 135 f/4.5	
Large (>55 mm filter) & unusual	18 f/3.5 (Note: 72 mm filters.) (Note: 49 mm attachment size used for a 49-72 mm step-up ring. 49 mm filters cannot be fitted due to mechanical interference with front meniscus element.)	35-70 f/3.5-4.8 (Note: 52 mm filters. Possibly not an original Olympus-designed lens, as the optical design is similar to other entry-level SLR lenses introduced in the late 1990s.); 35-80 f/2.8 (Note: 62 mm filters.)	70-210 f/4.5-5.6; 180 f/2 (Note: 100 mm filters.); 180 f/2.8; 250 f/2 (Note: 46 mm filters in rear drawer.); 300 f/4.5; 350 f/2.8; 400 f/6.3; 500 f/8 Reflex; 600 f/6.5; 1000 f/11	20 f/2; 20 f/3.5 (Note: Equipped with RMS thread mount, requires PM-MTob adapter for OM mount.) (Note: Manual diaphragm); 38 f/2.8; 38 f/3.5	8 f/2.8 Fisheye; 24 f/3.5 Shift

=== Four Thirds system lenses ===
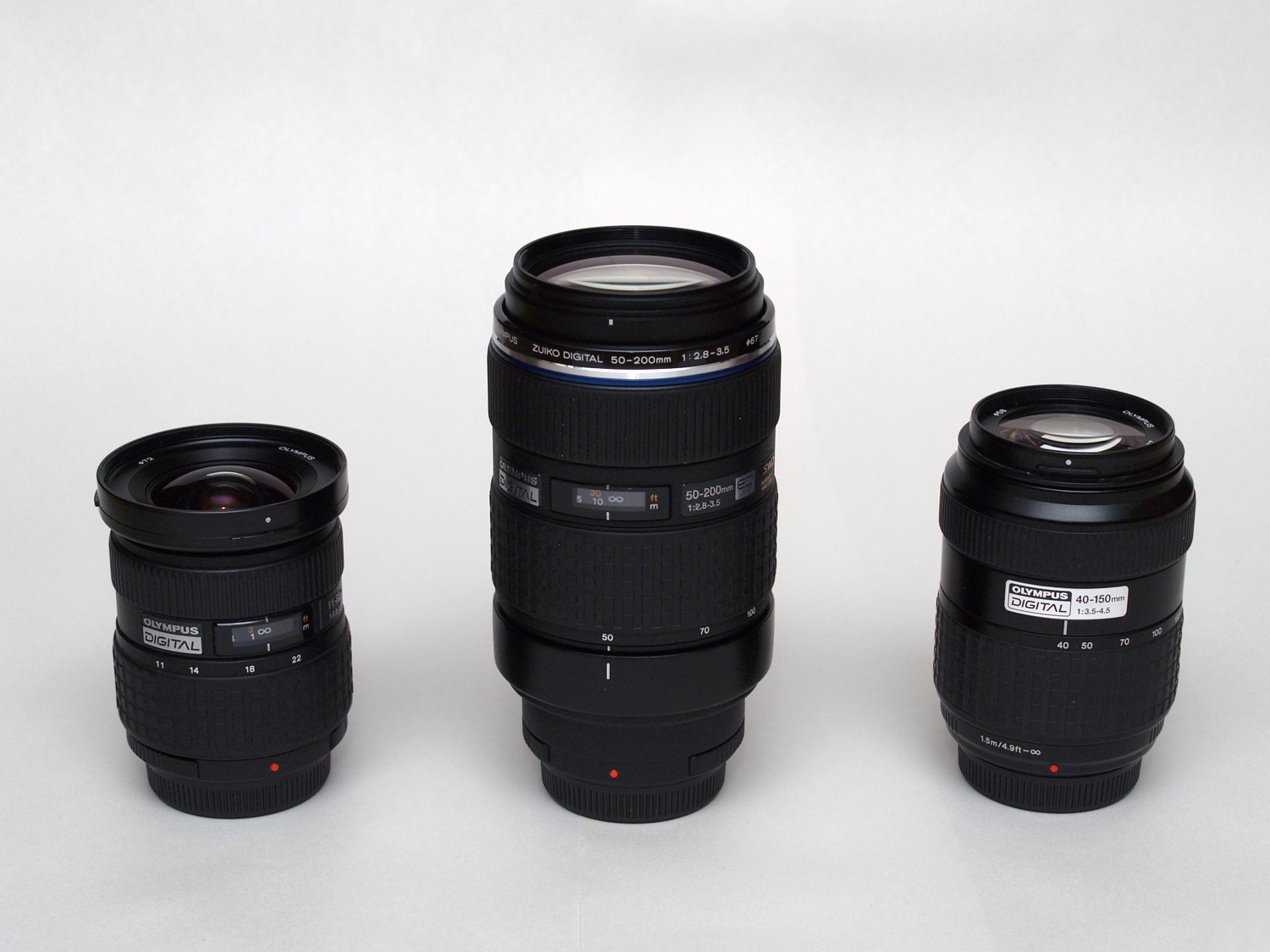
Olympus Zuiko Digital lenses for Four Thirds system cameras

The line of Zuiko Digital-branded lenses marketed for Four Thirds system digital single-lens reflex cameras consists of the following sets from least to most expensive, separated by marketing grade:

- Standard Grade (kit lenses and compact zooms)
- High Grade (HG, dust and weather sealed, faster apertures, marketed for professionals and advanced amateurs)
- Super High Grade (SHG, dust and weather sealed, prime and constant-aperture zoom lenses marketed towards working professional photographers)

HG and SHG lenses include a focus distance scale. All Zuiko Digital lenses are "true zooms" which do not shift the focus point through the focal length range.

To estimate the angle of view, the focal length of a Four Thirds lens may be multiplied by 2 to obtain the equivalent focal length for a 35 mm camera; e.g., the 9-18 mm zoom lens has an angle of view equivalent to an 18-36 mm lens for a 35 mm film camera. Likewise, the angle of view of adapted lenses may be estimated by multiplying the native focal length by 2; e.g., a 50 mm OM system lens adapted to a Four Thirds camera would have the same angle of view as a 100 mm lens for a 35 mm film camera.

Zuiko Digital-branded lenses for Four Thirds system cameras
	Wide angle	Standard	Telephoto	Macro	Special-purpose
Standard Grade	9–18 f/4–5.6	14–42 f/3.5–5.6; 14–45 f/3.5–5.6; 17.5–45 f/3.5–5.6; 18–180 f/3.5-6.3; 25 f/2.8	40–150 f/3.5–4.5; 40–150 f/4–5.6; 70–300 f/4–5.6	35 f/3.5 macro	
High Grade	11–22 f/2.8–3.5	12–60 f/2.8–4; 14–54 f/2.8–3.5 (II)	50–200 f/2.8–3.5 (SWD)	50 f/2 macro	8 f/3.5 fisheye
Super High Grade	7–14 f/4	14–35 f/2	35–100 f/2; 90–250 f/2.8; 150 f/2; 300 f/2.8		

=== Micro Four Thirds system lenses ===
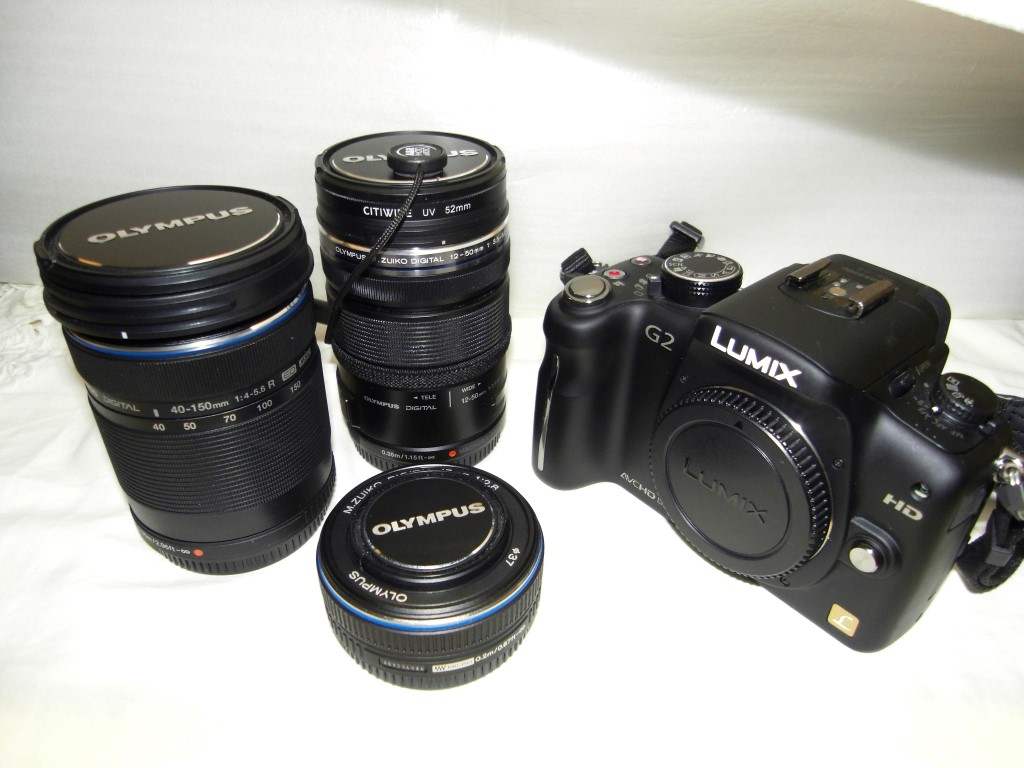
Olympus M.Zuiko Digital lenses with Panasonic DMC-G2 camera

The line of M.Zuiko Digital-branded lenses marketed for Micro Four Thirds system digital mirrorless cameras consists of the following marketing grade sets, from least to most expensive:

- Standard (camera kit lenses and other compact, lightweight lenses)
- Enhanced (dust and splash-proof) and Premium (primes with fast apertures)
- Professional grade (PRO) lenses marketed towards working professional photographers and prosumers

M.Zuiko Digital-branded lenses for Micro Four Thirds system cameras
Focal length / application Marketing grade	Wide angle	Standard	Telephoto	Macro	Special-purpose
Standard	9‍–‍18 f/4‍–‍5.6; 17 f/2.8	14–42 f/3.5–5.6 (L • II • II R • EZ); 14–150 f/4–5.6	40–150 f/4–5.6 (R); 75–300 f/4.8–6.7 (II); 100–400 f/5–6.3 IS (Note: Sealed against dust and splashes.)		15 f/8 (Note: Not branded 'M.Zuiko Digital'. Body cap lens with manual focus and fixed aperture.); 9 f/8 fisheye
Enhanced & Premium (Note: The Premium line consists solely of prime lenses.)	12 f/2; 17 f/1.8	12–50 f/3.5–6.3 EZ; 12–200 f/3.5–6.3; 14–150 f/4–5.6 II; 25 f/1.8	45 f/1.8; 75 f/1.8	30 f/3.5 macro; 60 f/2.8 macro	
PRO	7–14 f/2.8; 8–25 f/4; 17 f/1.2; 20 f/1.4	12–40 f/2.8; 12–45 f/4; 12–100 f/4 IS; 25 f/1.2	40–150 f/2.8; 150‍–‍400 f/4.5 TC1.25X IS; 45 f/1.2; 300 f/4 IS		8 f/1.8 fisheye

== See also ==
- Fujinon, the lens brand used by Fujifilm
- Hexanon, the lens brand used by Konica
- Nikkor, the lens brand used by Nikon
- Rokkor, the lens brand used by Minolta
- Serenar, the lens brand used by Canon
- Takumar, the lens brand used by Pentax
- Yashinon, the lens brand used by Yashica
- Yashikor
