= Olympus M.Zuiko Digital 14-42mm f/3.5-5.6 II =

Camera lens model

M.Zuiko Digital 14-42mm f3.5-5.6 II MSC
- Maker: Olympus Corporation

Technical data
- Type: Standard Zoom
- Focal length: 14-42mm
- Focal length (35mm equiv.): 28-84mm
- Aperture (max/min): f/3.5-5.6 -
- Close focus distance: 0.25 m (9.84 in)
- Max. magnification: 0.19
- Construction: 8 elements in 7 groups

Features
- Lens-based stabilization: No No
- Macro capable: No No

Physical
- Max. length: 50 mm (1.97 in)
- Diameter: 56.5 mm (2.22 in)
- Weight: 112g (3.95 oz)
- Filter diameter: Ø37 mm

Angle of view
- Diagonal: 75-29°

History
- Introduction: 2010

The M.Zuiko Digital 14–42 mm f/3.5-5.6 II MSC is a Micro Four Thirds System lens by Olympus Corporation. It is sold as a standalone item, and also as part of a kit along with bodies for all cameras in the Olympus PEN series.
