= Olympus M.Zuiko Digital ED 40-150mm f/2.8 PRO =

M.Zuiko Digital ED 40–150mm ƒ/2.8 PRO
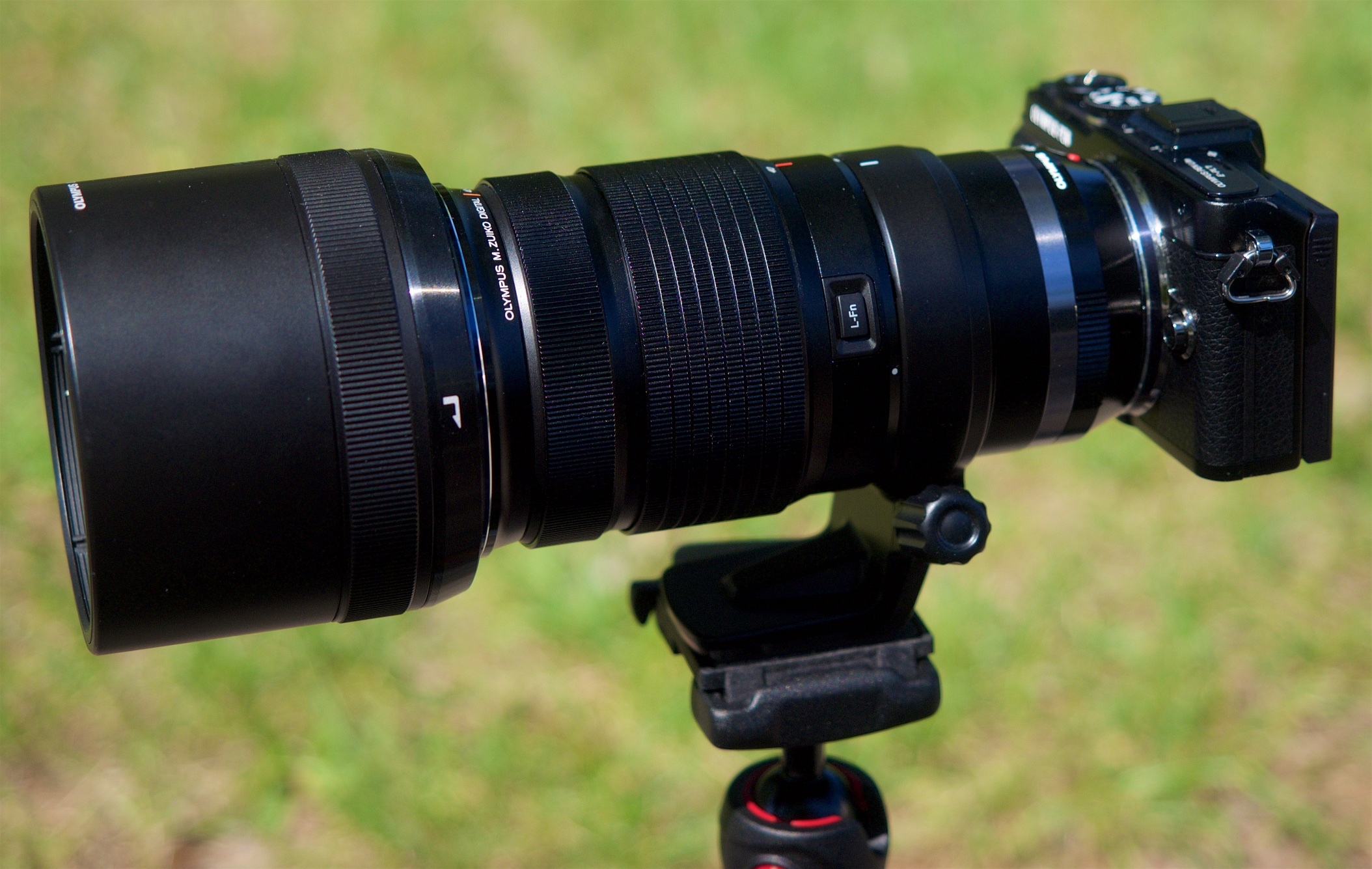
- M.Zuiko 40–150mm f/2.8 PRO lens with tripod mount on Olympus PEN E-PL7
- Maker: Olympus Corporation
- Lens mount: Micro Four Thirds

Technical data
- Type: Zoom
- Focus drive: Dual linear voice-coil motors
- Focal length: 40–150mm
- Focal length (35mm equiv.): 80–300mm
- Image format: Four Thirds (13×17.3mm)
- Aperture (max/min): f/2.8 / f/22
- Close focus distance: 0.7 m (2.3 ft)
- Max. magnification: 0.21× (35mm equivalent 0.42×)
- Diaphragm blades: 9, rounded
- Construction: 16 elements in 10 groups

Features
- Manual focus override: Yes Yes
- Weather-sealing: Yes Yes
- Lens-based stabilization: No No
- Macro capable: No No
- Application: Sports, wildlife, and portraiture

Physical
- Max. length: 160 mm (6.3 in)
- Diameter: 79 mm (3.1 in)
- Weight: 880 g (1.94 lb)
- Filter diameter: 72 mm

Software
- Latest firmware: 1.3 (as of 19 June 2019)
- User flashable: Yes

Accessories
- Lens hood: LH-76 (included)
- Case: LSC-1120 (included)

Angle of view
- Diagonal: 30°–8.2°

History
- Introduction: September 2014

Retail info
- MSRP: $1,499.99 USD

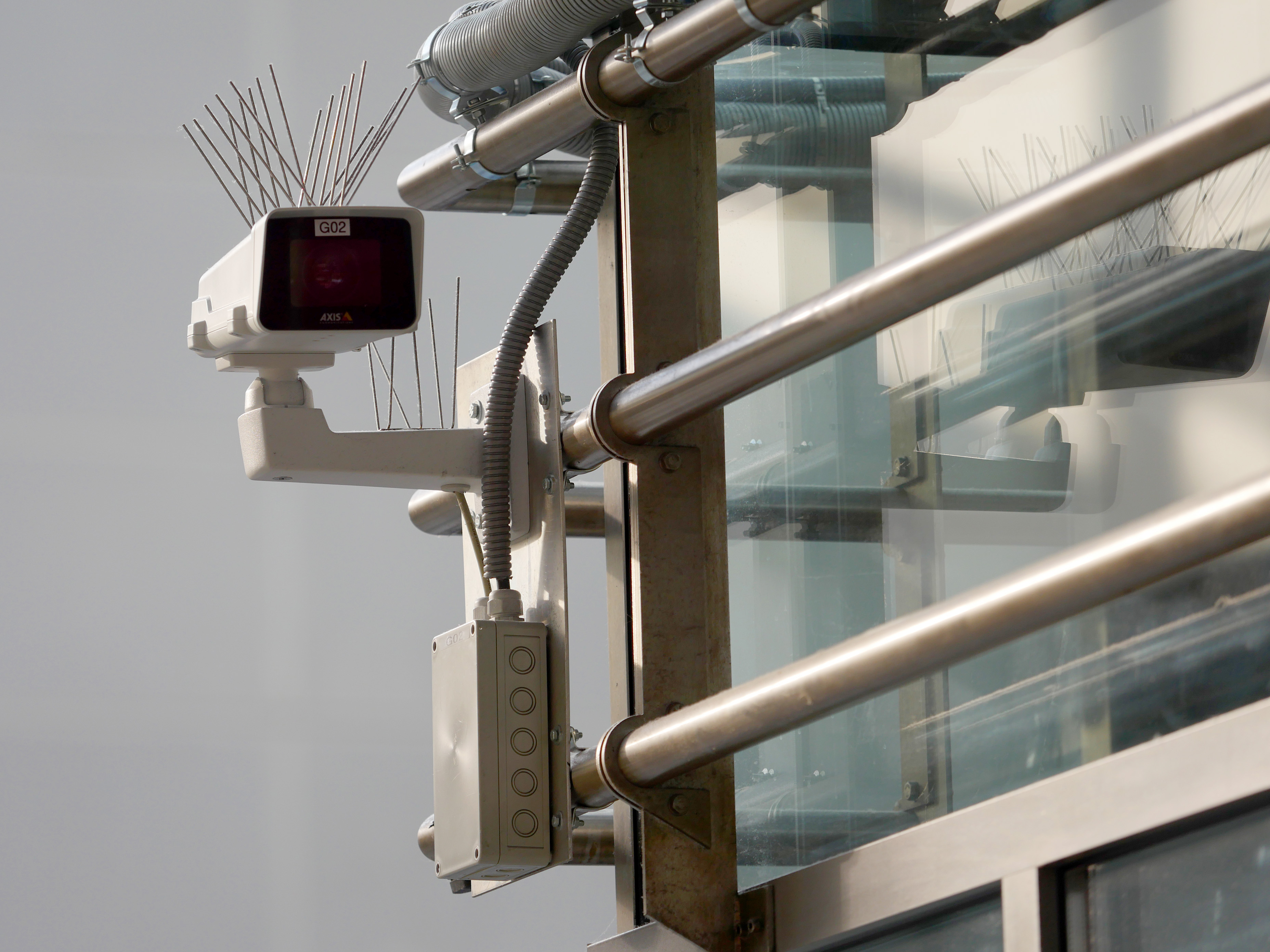
Example image taken with the M.Zuiko Digital ED 40–150mm f/2.8 PRO, at 150mm and f/2.8

The M.Zuiko Digital ED 40–150mm f/2.8 PRO is a professional telephoto zoom lens made by Olympus for the Micro Four Thirds system. It is the first telephoto lens in the Olympus M.Zuiko PRO range, which features weather-sealed, metal construction and high-performance optics intended to accompany the higher-end weather-sealed Olympus OM-D bodies such as the E-M1 Mark II. The lens features an integrated lens function button (configurable on the camera) and manual-focus clutch, and ships with a tripod collar and collapsible lens hood.

== Comparison ==
Compared to other camera systems with different normal focal lengths, and therefore, different image sensor sizes, the following equivalent values apply to lenses with appropriate properties as the M.Zuiko 40–150 mm f/2.8 PRO within the Micro Four Thirds system (MFT). With the parameters given in the table in all camera systems the photographer will get a similar angle of view, depth of field, diffraction limitation and motion blur (see also Micro Four Thirds system / Equivalents):

Image sensor format	Focal lengths at short end	Focal lengths at long end	F-number at same depth of field	ISO speed at same exposure time
Nikon CX	27 mm	100 mm	1.9	100
MFT	40 mm	150 mm	2.8	200
APS-C	53 mm	200 mm	3.7	360
Full frame	80 mm	300 mm	5.6	800
