= Olympus M.Zuiko Digital ED 14-42mm f/3.5-5.6 =

Olympus M.Zuiko Digital ED 14-42mm f3.5-5.6
- Maker: Olympus Corporation

Technical data
- Type: Standard Zoom
- Focal length: 14-42mm
- Focal length (35mm equiv.): 28-84mm
- Aperture (max/min): f/3.5-5.6 -
- Close focus distance: 0.25m (9.84 in)
- Max. magnification: 0.24
- Construction: 9 elements in 8 groups

Features
- Lens-based stabilization: No No
- Macro capable: No No

Physical
- Max. length: 43.5 mm (1.17 in)
- Diameter: 62 mm (2.44 in)
- Weight: 150g (5.3 oz)
- Filter diameter: Ø40.5mm

Angle of view
- Diagonal: 75-29°

History
- Introduction: 2009

The Olympus M.Zuiko Digital ED 14–42 mm f/3.5-5.6 is a Micro Four Thirds System lens by Olympus Corporation. It is sold as a standalone item, and also as part of a kit along with bodies for all cameras in the Olympus PEN series (the discontinued E-P1 and the current E-P2, E-PL1, and E-PL2). The lens is available in black or silver.
