= Olympus M.Zuiko Digital ED 9-18mm f/4-5.6 =

M.Zuiko Digital ED 9–18mm
- Maker: Olympus Corporation

Technical data
- Type: Wide angle Zoom
- Focal length: 9–18mm
- Focal length (35mm equiv.): 18-36mm
- Aperture (max/min): f/4.0-5.6 - f/22
- Close focus distance: 0.25m
- Max. magnification: 0.1
- Diaphragm blades: 7, circular aperture
- Construction: 12 elements in 8 groups

Physical
- Max. length: 49.5 mm
- Diameter: 56.5 mm
- Weight: 155g
- Filter diameter: Ø52mm

The Olympus Corporation M.Zuiko Digital ED 9–18mm f/4-5.6 is a Micro Four Thirds System lens. In the Micro Four Thirds format, it is a zoom ranging from wide to ultra-wide. Like many other Olympus Micro Four Thirds zooms, the front lens elements extend for use, and retract for storage.

The lens is "focus-by-wire"; the grip ring is not mechanically connected to the optics, but instead controls the autofocus motor. Users can reverse the ring focusing direction in the camera software.

Reviewers found sharpness to be competitive with the alternative Panasonic 7-14mm, despite a noticeably smaller collapsed size, lack of vignetting, and much lower price. However, they also note more chromatic aberration, and lower build quality.
