= Olympus Zuiko Digital ED 50mm f/2.0 Macro =

50mm interchangeable macro lens released by Olympus

Olympus Zuiko Digital ED 50mm 1:2.0 Macro
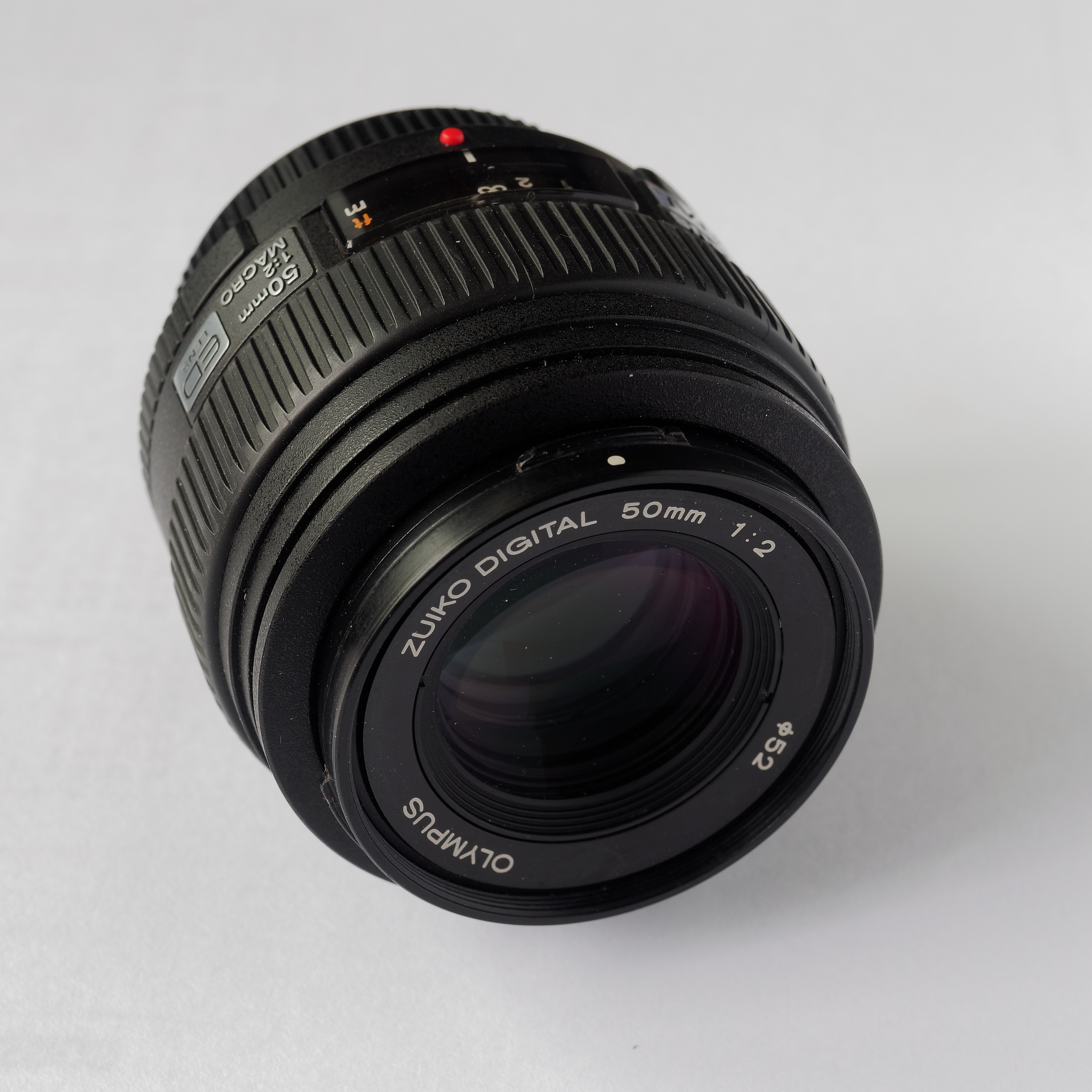
- Maker: Olympus
- Lens mount(s): Four Thirds

Technical data
- Type: Prime
- Focal length: 50mm
- Aperture (max/min): f/2.0
- Close focus distance: 0.20 metres (0.66 ft)
- Max. magnification: 0.5
- Diaphragm blades: 7
- Construction: 11 elements in 10 groups

Features
- Manual focus override: No No
- Weather-sealing: Yes Yes
- Lens-based stabilization: No No
- Aperture ring: No No

Physical
- Max. length: 62 millimetres (2.4 in)
- Diameter: 71 millimetres (2.8 in)
- Weight: 300 grams (0.66 lb)
- Filter diameter: 52mm

Accessories
- Lens hood: LH-43

History
- Introduction: 2003

The Olympus Zuiko Digital ED 50mm 1:2.0 Macro is an interchangeable macro lens for the Four Thirds system with 1:2 maximum magnification. It was announced by Olympus Corporation on June 24, 2003.

| Kind | Type | Focal length | Aperture | 2000s | | | | | | | 2010s | | | | | | | |
| Kind | Type | Focal length | Aperture | 03 | 04 | 05 | 06 | 07 | 08 | 09 | 10 | 11 | 12 | 13 | 14 | 15 | 16 | 17 |
| Prime | Fish-eye | 8 | 3.5 | | | | Olympus Zuiko Digital 8mm F3.5 | | | | | | | | | | | |
| Prime | Norm. | 24 | 1.8 | | | | Sigma 24mm F1.8 EX DG | | | | | | | | | | | |
| Prime | Norm. | 25 | 1.4 | | | | | Leica D Summilux 25mm F1.4 ASPH | | | | | | | | | | |
| Prime | Norm. | 25 | 2.8 | | | | | | Olympus Zuiko Digital 25mm F2.8 | | | | | | | | | |
| Prime | Norm. | 30 | 1.4 | | | | Sigma 30mm F1.4 EX DC HSM | | | | | | | | | | | |
| Prime | Norm. | 35 | 3.5 | | | Olympus Zuiko Digital 35mm F3.5 Macro | | | | | | | | | | | | |
| Prime | Tele | 50 | 1.4 | | | | | | Sigma 50mm F1.4 EX DG HSM | | | | | | | | | |
| Prime | Tele | 50 | 2.0 | Olympus Zuiko Digital ED 50mm F2.0 Macro | | | | | | | | | | | | | | |
| Prime | Tele | 105 | 2.8 | | | | Sigma 105mm F2.8 EX DG Macro | | | | | | | | | | | |
| Prime | Tele | 150 | 2.0 | | | | | | | Olympus Zuiko Digital ED 150mm F2 | | | | | | | | |
| Prime | Tele | 150 | 2.8 | | | | Sigma 150mm F2.8 EX DG APO Macro HSM | | | | | | | | | | | |
| Prime | Super tele | 300 | 2.8 | | Olympus Zuiko Digital ED 300mm F2.8 | | | | | | | | | | | | | |
| Zoom | UWA | 7-14 | 4.0 | | | Olympus Zuiko Digital ED 7-14mm F4 | | | | | | | | | | | | |
| Zoom | UWA | 9-18 | 4–5.6 | | | | | | Olympus Zuiko Digital ED 9-18mm F4-5.6 | | | | | | | | | |
| Zoom | UWA | 10-20 | 4–5.6 | | | | | | Sigma 10-20mm F4.0-5.6 EX DC HSM | | | | | | | | | |
| Zoom | UWA | 11-22 | 2.8–3.5 | | Olympus Zuiko Digital 11-22mm F2.8-3.5 | | | | | | | | | | | | | |
| Zoom | Std. | 12-60 | 2.8–4 | | | | | | | Olympus Zuiko Digital ED 12-60mm F2.8-4 SWD | | | | | | | | |
| Zoom | Std. | 14-xx | 2.0 | | | Olympus Zuiko Digital ED 14-35mm f/2.0 SWD | | | | | | | | | | | | |
| Zoom | Std. | 14-xx | 2.8-3.5 | Olympus Zuiko Digital 14-54mm F2.8-3.5 | | | | | Olympus Zuiko Digital 14-54mm F2.8-3.5 II | | | | | | | | | |
| Zoom | Std. | 14-xx | 2.8-3.5 | | | | | | Leica D Vario-Elmarit 14-50mm F2.8-3.5 ASPH | | | | | | | | | |
| Zoom | Std. | 14-xx | 3.5-5.6 | | Olympus Zuiko Digital 14-45mm F3.5-5.6 | | | | | | | | | | | | | |
| Zoom | Std. | 14-xx | 3.5-5.6 | | | | | Leica D Vario-Elmar 14-150mm F3.5-5.6 ASPH | | | | | | | | | | |
| Zoom | Std. | 14-xx | 3.8-5.6 | | | | Leica D Vario-Elmar 14-50mm F3.8-5.6 ASPH | | | | | | | | | | | |
| Zoom | Std. | 17,5-45 | 3.5-5.6 | | | Olympus Zuiko Digital 17.5-45mm F3.5-5.6 | | | | | | | | | | | | |
| Zoom | Std. | 18-50 | 2.8 | | | | Sigma 18-50mm F2.8 EX DC | | | | | | | | | | | |
| Zoom | Std. | 18-50 | 3.5-5.6 | | Sigma 18-50mm F3.5-5.6 DC | | | | | | | | | | | | | |
| Zoom | Std. | 18-125 | 3.5-5.6 | | | | Sigma 18-125mm F3.5-5.6 DC | | | | | | | | | | | |
| Zoom | Std. | 18-180 | 3.5–6.3 | | | | Olympus Zuiko Digital ED 18-180mm F3.5-6.3 | | | | | | | | | | | |
| Zoom | Tele | 35-100 | 2.0 | | | Olympus Zuiko Digital ED 35-100mm F2 | | | | | | | | | | | | |
| Zoom | Tele | 50-500 | 4.0-6.3 | | | | | | | Sigma 50-500mm F4-6.3 EX DG HSM | | | | | | | | |
| Zoom | Tele | 5x-200 | 2.8-3.5 | Olympus Zuiko Digital ED 50-200mm f/2.8-3.5 | | | | Olympus Zuiko Digital ED 50-200mm F2.8-3.5 SWD | | | | | | | | | | |
| Zoom | Tele | 5x-200 | 4-5.6 | | | | | | Sigma 55-200mm F4-5.6 DC | | | | | | | | | |
| Zoom | Tele | 70-200 | 2.8 | | | | | | | Sigma 70-200mm F2.8 EX DG Macro II HSM | | | | | | | | |
| Zoom | Tele | 70-300 | 4-5.6 | | | | | Olympus Zuiko Digital ED 70-300mm F4-5.6 | | | | | | | | | | |
| Zoom | Tele | 40-150 | 3.5-4.5 | | Olympus Zuiko Digital 40-150mm F3.5-4.5 | | | | | | | | | | | | | |
| Zoom | Tele | 40-150 | 4-5.6 | | | | Olympus Zuiko Digital ED 40-150mm F4-5.6 | | | | | | | | | | | |
| Zoom | Super Tele | 90-250 | 2.8 | | | Olympus Zuiko Digital ED 90-250mm F2.8 | | | | | | | | | | | | |
| Zoom | Super Tele | 135-400 | 4.5-5.6 | | | | | Sigma 135-400mm F4.5-5.6 DG APO | | | | | | | | | | |
| Zoom | Super Tele | 300-800 | 5.6 | | | | | Sigma 300-800mm F5.6 EX DG HSM APO | | | | | | | | | | |
| Teleconverter | | | | | Olympus Zuiko Digital 1.4x Teleconverter EC-14 | | | | | | | | | | | | | |
| Teleconverter | | | | | Olympus Zuiko Digital 2x Teleconverter EC-20 | | | | | | | | | | | | | |
| Extension tube | | | | | Olympus Extension Tube EX-25 | | | | | | | | | | | | | |
| Kind | Type | Focal length | Aperture | 03 | 04 | 05 | 06 | 07 | 08 | 09 | 10 | 11 | 12 | 13 | 14 | 15 | 16 | 17 |
| Kind | Type | Focal length | Aperture | 2000s | | | | | | | 2010s | | | | | | | |
