= Four Thirds system =

Digital camera design standard

Four Thirds logo

The Four Thirds System is a standard created by Olympus and Eastman Kodak for digital single-lens reflex camera (DSLR) design and development. Four Thirds refers to both the size of the image sensor (4/3") as well as the aspect ratio (4:3). The Olympus E-1 was the first Four Thirds DSLR, announced and released in 2003. In 2008, Olympus and Panasonic began publicizing the Micro Four Thirds system, a mirrorless camera system which used the same sensor size; by eliminating the reflex mirror, the Micro Four Thirds cameras were significantly smaller than the Four Thirds cameras. The first Micro Four Thirds cameras were released in 2009 and the final Four Thirds cameras were released in 2010; by that time, approximately 15 Four Thirds camera models had been released by Olympus and Panasonic in total. Micro Four Thirds has become a rarer format, with most companies such as Canon and Nikon creating Full-Frame and APS-C cameras for professionals and enthusiasts.

The system provides a standard that permits interoperability of digital cameras and lenses made by different manufacturers. Proponents describe it as an open standard, but companies may use it only under a non-disclosure agreement.

Unlike older single-lens reflex (SLR) systems, Four Thirds was designed from the start for digital cameras. Many lenses are extensively computerised, to the point that Olympus offers firmware updates for many of them. Lens design has been tailored to the requirements of digital sensors, most notably through telecentric designs.

The image sensor format, between those of larger SLRs using "full-frame" and APS-C sensors, and smaller point-and-shoot compact digital cameras, yields intermediate levels of cost, performance, and convenience. The size of the sensor is smaller than most DSLRs and this implies that lenses, especially telephoto lenses, can be smaller. For example, a Four Thirds lens with a 300 mm focal length would cover about the same angle of view as a 600 mm focal length lens for the 35 mm film standard, and is correspondingly more compact. Thus, the Four Thirds System has crop factor (aka focal length multiplier) of about 2, and while this enables longer focal length for greater magnification, it does not necessarily aid the manufacture of wide angle lenses.

== History ==
Kodak and Olympus announced in February 2001 they would share digital camera technologies; Olympus committed to purchase high-resolution charge-coupled device (CCD) sensors which would be jointly developed by the two companies and manufactured by Kodak. A few months later, an internal Kodak presentation revealed that Olympus was developing a DSLR using Kodak's KAF-C5100E 5.1 megapixel 4/3" sensor, with a tentative schedule to announce the camera at the 2002 Photo Marketing Association exposition; Olympus confirmed they were developing a "concept camera" with that sensor size.

The Four Thirds System was announced jointly by Olympus and Kodak at photokina in September 2002. The first camera was the Olympus E-1, announced on June 24, 2003, and aimed at the professional market, with shipments to commence in September. In February 2004, Olympus announced that Panasonic, Sanyo, and Sigma Corporation had joined the consortium. The second Four Thirds DSLR, the Olympus E-300, was introduced that year, without the typical protrusion on the top deck, as the designers had chosen to use a "porro finder" which had four mirrors instead of a standard pentaprism, similar to the design of the viewfinder used in the Olympus Pen F half-frame film SLR.

In 2006, Olympus and Panasonic announced they had collaborated on the design of a new sensor, branded Live MOS, using a body design similar to that of the E-300; the result was three similar cameras, sold as the Olympus E-330, Panasonic DMC-L1, and Leica Digilux 3. Nearly all of the successive Four Thirds camera models would use sensors from Panasonic, with the sole exception of the Olympus E-400 (2006), which was equipped with a CCD but sold only in Europe.

=== Micro Four Thirds System ===
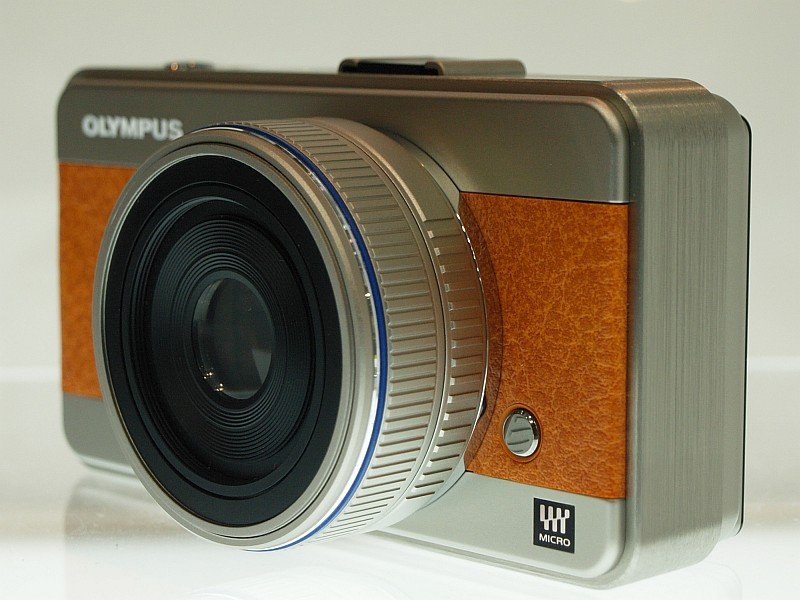
Concept Micro Four Thirds camera by Olympus

In August 2008, Olympus and Panasonic introduced a new format, Micro Four Thirds.

The new system uses the same sensor, but removes the mirror box from the camera design. A live preview is shown on either the camera's main liquid-crystal display or via an electronic viewfinder, as in digital compact cameras. Autofocus may be accomplished via a contrast detection process using the main imager, again similar to digital compact cameras. Some Olympus and Panasonic manufactured camera bodies also feature phase detection auto focus built into the sensor. The goal of the new system was to allow for even smaller cameras, competing directly with higher-end point-and-shoot compact digital cameras and DSLRs. The smaller flange focal distance allows for more compact normal and wide angle lenses. It also facilitates the use, with an adapter, of lenses based on other mounting systems, including many manual focus lenses from the seventies and eighties.

In particular, Four Thirds lenses can be used on Micro Four Thirds bodies with an adapter; however, "all of the functions of the Micro Four Thirds System may not always be available."

With the emphasis shifted to the Micro Four Thirds system, member companies began discontinuing manufacturing and support for Four Thirds system products. The final Four Thirds camera, the Olympus E-5, was released in 2010. In 2013, Olympus released the Olympus E-M1, which is a Micro Four Thirds camera with enhanced support for legacy Four Thirds lenses using on-chip phase detection autofocus. Olympus discontinued production of the Zuiko Digital lenses for Four Thirds in 2017.

== Design ==
The standard for the lens mount is described in US Patent 6,910,814.

=== Sensor size and aspect ratio ===
Drawing showing the relative sizes of sensors used in most current digital cameras, including Four Thirds System

The name of the system stems from the size of the image sensor used in the cameras, which is commonly referred to as a 4/3" type or 4/3 type sensor. The common inch-based sizing system is derived from vacuum image-sensing video camera tubes, which are now obsolete. The imaging area of a Four Thirds sensor is equal to that of a video camera tube of 4/3 inch diameter.

Sizes of the sensors used in most current digital cameras relative to a standard 35mm frame

The usual size of the sensor is 18 mm × 13.5 mm (22.5 mm diagonal), with an imaging area of 17.3 mm × 13.0 mm, giving a diagonal of 21.64 mm. The sensor's area is about 30–40% smaller than APS-C sensors used in most other DSLRs, but still around 9 times larger than the 1/2.5" sensors typically used in compact digital cameras. Incidentally, the imaging area of a Four Thirds sensor is almost identical to that of 110 film.

The emphasis on the 4:3 image aspect ratio sets Four Thirds apart from other DSLR systems, which usually adhere to the 3:2 aspect ratio of the traditional 35mm format. However, the standard only specifies the sensor diagonal, thus Four Thirds cameras using the standard 3:2 aspect ratio would be possible; notably newer Panasonic Micro Four Thirds models even offer shooting at multiple aspect ratios while maintaining the same image diagonal. For instance, the Panasonic GH1 uses a multi-aspect sensor designed to maximize use of the image circle at 4:3, 3:2, and 16:9; each ratio having a diagonal of 22.5 mm.

Sensor aspect ratio influences lens design. For example, many lenses designed by Olympus for the Four Thirds System contain internal rectangular baffles or permanently mounted "petal" lens hoods that optimise their operation for the 4:3 aspect ratio.

In an interview John Knaur, a Senior Product Manager at Olympus, stated that "The FourThirds refers to both the size of the imager and the aspect ratio of the sensor". He also pointed out the similarities between 4:3 and the standard printing size of 8×10 as well as medium format 6×4.5 and 6×7 cameras, thus helping explain Olympus' rationale on choosing 4:3 rather than 3:2.

=== Advantages ===
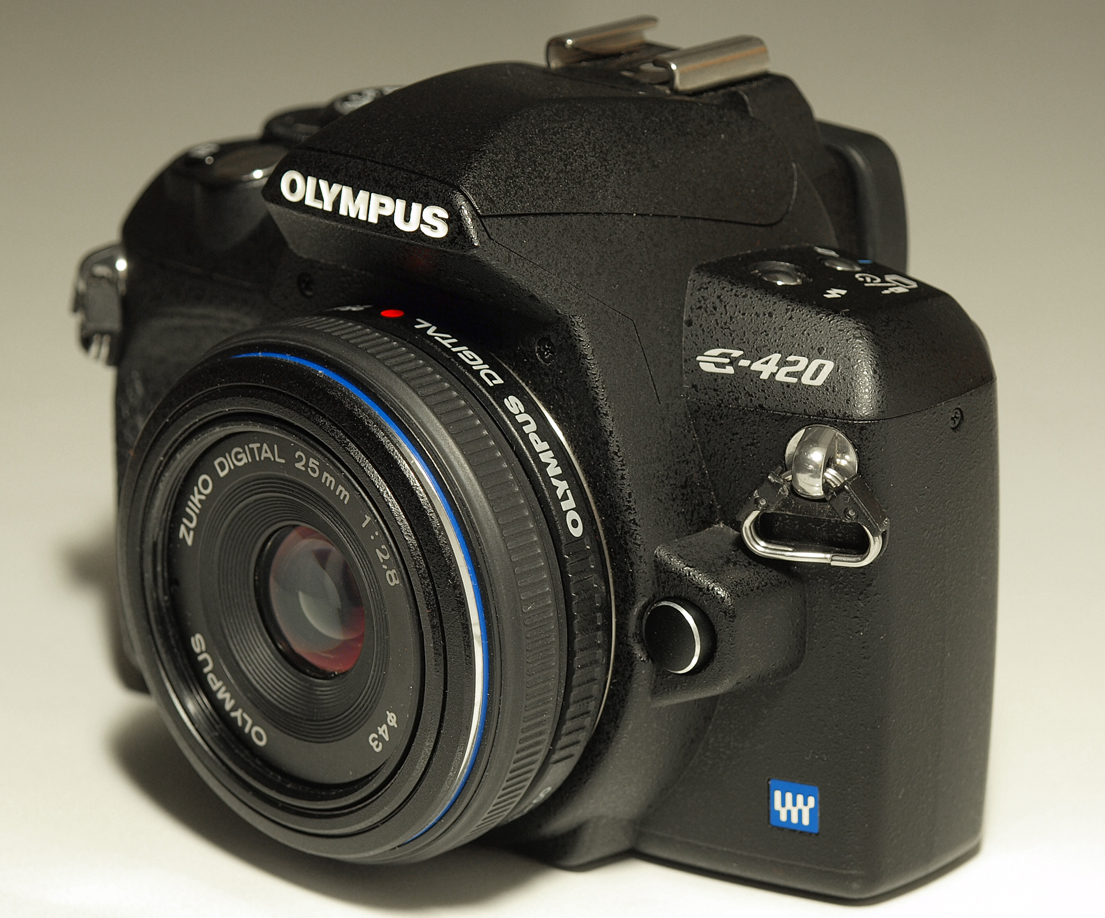
- An Olympus E-420 camera, sold with a very thin 25mm "pancake" lens. The E-4XX series was advertised as the smallest true DSLR in the world.
  The smaller sensor size makes it possible to produce smaller, lighter camera bodies and lenses. In particular, the Four-Thirds system allows the development of compact, large aperture lenses. Lenses with equivalent field of view for larger sensor formats tend to be larger, heavier and more expensive.
- Telecentric optical path means that light hitting the sensor is traveling closer to perpendicular to the sensor, resulting in brighter corners, and improved off-center resolution, particularly on wide angle lenses.
- Because the flange focal distance is shorter than those of legacy film SLR lens mounts, such as Canon FD, Canon EF, Nikon F, Olympus OM, and Pentax K, lenses for many other SLR types may be fitted to Four Thirds cameras using simple mechanical adapter rings. Such mechanical adapter rings typically require manual setting of focus and aperture.

=== Disadvantages ===
- Compared to a larger sensor with equivalent pixel count, a Four Thirds sensor gathers disproportionately less light per pixel. Not only are the individual photosites smaller, but each loses more of its total area to support circuitry and edge shading than a larger photosite would. With less captured light to work with, each photosite requires additional amplification, with associated higher noise as well as reduced dynamic range. A telecentric lens design can mitigate this problem, but the sensor remains more sensitive to the angle of incoming light, and has more pronounced image corner light falloff.
- The resolution of a sensor is often measured as the total sensor pixel count in megapixels, and this is often a primary decision-making factor in choosing a camera. Smaller sensors are tougher to manufacture with the same pixel count as larger sensors, and place a greater demand on optics, since a lens must achieve greater absolute resolving power to produce an adequate picture on a smaller sensor, compared to a larger sensor of the same pixel resolution. A smaller pixel active area reduces the averaging effect and allows a better sampling of high spatial frequencies, mitigating this problem.
- To get the same angle of view as with a larger sensor, the focal length of the lens used with a Four Thirds sensor needs to be shorter. However, to get the same depth of field and light gathering capability as with a larger sensor, the lens aperture needs to be kept constant. In other words, the focal ratio of the lens must be smaller on the Four Thirds system to give the same depth of field and image noise. Since it is more difficult to produce faster lenses (lenses with smaller focal ratios), it can be difficult or impossible to find a lens that produces as shallow a depth of field, and gathers as much light, as an equivalent lens on larger formats. For instance, a 35mm "full-frame" DSLR can match the depth of field of a Four Thirds camera by closing down the aperture by two stops; but it may be more difficult or impossible for a Four Thirds System to match the shallow depth of field of a 35mm camera using a fast lens.

=== Differences ===
- Most Four Thirds cameras (notably those manufactured by Olympus) use an aspect ratio of 4:3 rather than 3:2; newer models offer cropping to 3:2, but this results in a reduced image diagonal (i.e., the effective crop factor is then 2.08).

== Members and products ==
=== Four Thirds System companies ===
As of the 2006 Photo Marketing Association Annual Convention and Trade Show, the Four Thirds consortium consisted of the following companies:

- Fuji
- Kodak
- Leica
- Olympus
- Panasonic
- Sanyo
- Sigma

This does not imply a commitment to end user products by each company. Historically, only Leica, Olympus, and Panasonic have produced bodies. Olympus and Leica/Panasonic have made dedicated Four Thirds lenses, and Sigma makes adapted versions of their "DC" lenses for APS-C format DSLRs. Kodak once sold sensors to Olympus for use in their Four Thirds bodies, but the newer Olympus Four Thirds cameras used Panasonic sensors.

=== Four Thirds System cameras ===
The majority of Four Thirds System cameras and Four Thirds lenses are made by Olympus. Many Four Thirds cameras use "sensor-shift" in-body image stabilization, making the need for image stabilization technology in its lenses unnecessary. All Four Thirds cameras also incorporate an automatic sensor cleaning device, in which a thin glass filter in front of the sensor vibrates at 30 kHz, causing dust to fall off and adhere to a piece of sticky material below. Olympus' E-system camera bodies are noted for their inclusion of a wide range of firmware-level features and customization, good JPEG engine, and compact size. Because of the smaller format of Four Thirds, the viewfinders tend to be smaller than on comparable cameras.

Manufacture of Four Thirds cameras came to an end after the introduction of the mirrorless Micro Four Thirds format. The models that were marketed include:

Four Thirds system cameras
Name	Image	Segment	Announced	Max. Resolution (MP)	Sensor	IS	Sealed	Dims. (W×H×D)	Wgt	Refs.
Olympus E-1		Professional	Jun 24, 2003	2560×1920 (5.1)	CCD	No	Yes	141.0 mm × 104.0 mm × 81.0 mm (5.6 in × 4.1 in × 3.2 in)	660 g (23 oz)	
Olympus E-300		Adv. Amateur	Sep 27, 2004	3264×2448 (8)	CCD	No	No	146.5 mm × 85 mm × 64 mm (5.8 in × 3.3 in × 2.5 in)	580 g (20 oz)	
Olympus E-500		Consumer	Sep 26, 2005	3264×2448 (8)	CCD	No	No	129.5 mm × 94.5 mm × 66.0 mm (5.1 in × 3.7 in × 2.6 in)	435 g (15.3 oz)	
Olympus E-330		Adv. Amateur	Jan 26, 2006	3136×2352 (7.5)	CMOS	No	No	140.0 mm × 87.0 mm × 72.0 mm (5.5 in × 3.4 in × 2.8 in)	550 g (19 oz)	
Panasonic DMC-L1		Adv. Amateur	Feb 26, 2006	3136×2352 (7.5)	CMOS	No	No	145.8 mm × 86.9 mm × 80.0 mm (5.7 in × 3.4 in × 3.1 in)	530 g (19 oz)	
Leica Digilux 3		Adv. Amateur	Sep 14, 2006	3136×2352 (7.5)	CMOS	No	No	145.8 mm × 86.9 mm × 80.0 mm (5.7 in × 3.4 in × 3.1 in)	530 g (19 oz)	
Olympus E-400		Consumer	Sep 14, 2006	3648×2736 (10.1)	CCD	No	No	129.5 mm × 91.0 mm × 53.0 mm (5.1 in × 3.6 in × 2.1 in)	375 g (13.2 oz)	
Olympus E-410		Consumer	Mar 5, 2007	3648×2736 (10.1)	CMOS	No	No	129.5 mm × 91.0 mm × 53.0 mm (5.1 in × 3.6 in × 2.1 in)	375 g (13.2 oz)	
Olympus E-510		Adv. Amateur	Mar 5, 2007	3648×2736 (10.1)	CMOS	Yes	No	136.0 mm × 91.5 mm × 68.0 mm (5.4 in × 3.6 in × 2.7 in)	460 g (16 oz)	
Panasonic DMC-L10		Consumer	Aug 30, 2007	3648×2736 (10.1)	CMOS	No	No	134.5 mm × 95.5 mm × 77.5 mm (5.3 in × 3.8 in × 3.1 in)	530 g (19 oz)	
Olympus E-3		Professional	Oct 16, 2007	3648×2736 (10.1)	CMOS	Yes	Yes	142.5 mm × 116.5 mm × 74.5 mm (5.6 in × 4.6 in × 2.9 in)	810 g (29 oz)	
Olympus E-420		Consumer	Mar 5, 2008	3648×2736 (10.1)	CMOS	No	No	129.5 mm × 91.0 mm × 53.0 mm (5.1 in × 3.6 in × 2.1 in)	380 g (13 oz)	
Olympus E-520		Adv. Amateur	May 13, 2008	3648×2736 (10.1)	CMOS	Yes	No	136.0 mm × 91.5 mm × 68.0 mm (5.4 in × 3.6 in × 2.7 in)	475 g (16.8 oz)	
Olympus E-30		Semi-professional	Nov 5, 2008	4032×3024 (12.3)	CMOS	Yes	No	141.5 mm × 107.5 mm × 75.0 mm (5.6 in × 4.2 in × 3.0 in)	655 g (23.1 oz)	
Olympus E-620		Adv. Amateur	Feb 24, 2009	4032×3024 (12.3)	CMOS	Yes	No	130.0 mm × 94.0 mm × 60.0 mm (5.1 in × 3.7 in × 2.4 in)	475 g (16.8 oz)	
Olympus E-450		Consumer	Mar 31, 2009	3648×2736 (10.1)	CMOS	No	No	129.5 mm × 91.0 mm × 53.0 mm (5.1 in × 3.6 in × 2.1 in)	380 g (13 oz)	
Olympus E-600		Adv. Amateur	Aug 30, 2009	4032×3024 (12.3)	CMOS	Yes	No	130.0 mm × 94.0 mm × 60.0 mm (5.1 in × 3.7 in × 2.4 in)	475 g (16.8 oz)	
Olympus E-5		Professional	Sep 14, 2010	4032×3024 (12.3)	CMOS	Yes	Yes	142.5 mm × 116.5 mm × 74.5 mm (5.6 in × 4.6 in × 2.9 in)	800 g (28 oz)	

=== Four Thirds System lenses ===
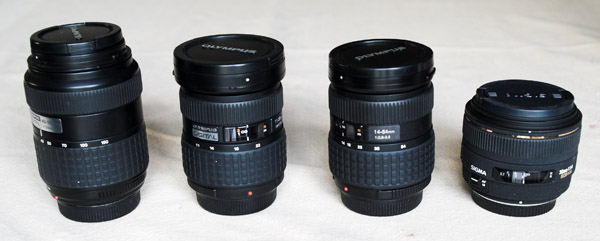
Four lenses for the Four Thirds System. From left to right, three Olympus zooms (40–150mm, 11–22mm and 14–54mm) and a Sigma prime (30mm).

The Four Thirds lens mount is specified to be a bayonet type with a flange focal distance of 38.67 mm.

There were 41 lenses made for the Four Thirds System standard, including two that were modified and re-released in approximately 2009 with improved mechanisms but otherwise identical optics. (Note: These were the 14–54mm and 50–200mm, both manufactured by Olympus; each version is counted as a separate lens.)

Before announcing that it would stop production of Four Thirds lenses in early 2017, Olympus produced 24 lenses for the Four Thirds System under their "Zuiko Digital" brand. They are divided into three grades — Standard, High Grade and Super High Grade. High Grade lenses have faster maximum apertures, but are significantly more expensive and larger, and the Super High Grade zooms have constant maximum aperture over the full zoom range; all but the Standard grade are weather-sealed. Lenses within each grade cover the range from wide-angle to super telephoto. The Zuiko Digital lenses are well regarded for their consistently good optics. The following table lists all Zuiko Digital lenses available at the time Olympus stopped Four Thirds production:

	Wide angle	Standard	Telephoto	Super telephoto	Special-purpose
Standard	9–18 f/4–5.6	14–42 f/3.5–5.6 25 f/2.8 "pancake"	40–150 f/4–5.6	70–300 f/4–5.6 macro	35 f/3.5 macro 18–180 f/3.5-6.3 superzoom
High Grade	11–22 f/2.8–3.5	12–60 f/2.8–4 14–54 f/2.8–3.5 II	50–200 f/2.8–3.5 SWD		50 f/2 macro 8 f/3.5 fisheye
Super High Grade	7–14 f/4	14–35 f/2	35–100 f/2 150 f/2	90–250 f/2.8 300 f/2.8	

Olympus also made 1.4× and 2× teleconverters and an electronically coupled extension tube.

Sigma has adapted 13 lenses for the Four Thirds System, ranging from 10 mm to 800 mm, including several for which no equivalent exists: the fast primes (30 mm f/1.4 and 50 mm f/1.4) and extreme telephoto (300–800 mm f/5.6). As of 2014 all Sigma lenses for the Four Thirds System have been discontinued.

Leica has designed four lenses for the Four Thirds System: fast and slow normal zooms and a 14–150 mm super-zoom, all with Panasonic's image stabilization system, and an unstabilized f/1.4 25 mm prime. These are manufactured and sold by Panasonic.

An official list of available lenses can be found on Four-Thirds.org web site.

As for the system itself, it was silently discontinued in favor of the Micro Four Thirds System.

List of Four Thirds System lenses
Name	Mfr.	F.L. (mm)	Ap., Blades (Note: Number of aperture blades; (C) if designed for a circular opening)	Splash / Dust (Note: Sealed against splashes and dust.)	OIS	Const.	Angle	Min. focus	Filter (mm)	Dims. (Φ×L)	Wgt.	Notes / Refs.
Fisheye lenses
ZUIKO DIGITAL ED 8mm F3.5 Fisheye	Olympus	8	f/3.5–22, 7(C)	Yes	No	10e/6g	180°	0.135 m (5.31 in)	—	79 mm × 77 mm (3.11 in × 3.03 in)	485 g (17.1 oz)	
Ultra wide angle lenses
ZUIKO DIGITAL ED 7-14mm F4.0	Olympus	7–14	f/4–22, 7(C)	Yes	No	18e/12g	114–75°	0.25 m (9.84 in)	—	86.5 mm × 119.5 mm (3.41 in × 4.70 in)	780 g (27.5 oz)	
ZUIKO DIGITAL ED 9-18mm F4.0-5.6	Olympus	9–18	f/4~5.6–22, 7(C)	No	No	13e/9g	100–62°	0.25 m (9.84 in)	72	79.5 mm × 73 mm (3.13 in × 2.87 in)	275 g (9.7 oz)	
Wide angle lenses
10-20mm F4-5.6 EX DC HSM	Sigma	10–20	f/4~5.6–22, 6	No	No	14e/10g	94.5–56.8°	0.24 m (9.45 in)	77	83.5 mm × 86.4 mm (3.29 in × 3.40 in)	495 g (17.5 oz)	
ZUIKO DIGITAL 11-22mm F2.8-3.5	Olympus	11–22	f/2.8~3.5–22, 7	Yes	No	12e/10g	89–53°	0.28 m (11.02 in)	72	75 mm × 92.5 mm (2.95 in × 3.64 in)	485 g (17.1 oz)	
Normal lenses
ZUIKO DIGITAL ED 12-60mm F2.8-4.0 SWD	Olympus	12–60	f/2.8~4–22, 7(C)	Yes	No	14e/10g	84–20°	0.25 m (9.84 in)	72	79.5 mm × 98.5 mm (3.13 in × 3.88 in)	575 g (20.3 oz)	
ZUIKO DIGITAL ED 14-35mm F2.0 SWD	Olympus	14–35	f/2.0–22, 9(C)	Yes	No	18e/17g	75–34°	0.35 m (13.78 in)	77	86 mm × 123 mm (3.39 in × 4.84 in)	900 g (31.7 oz)	
ZUIKO DIGITAL ED 14-42mm F3.5-5.6	Olympus	14–42	f/3.5~5.6–22, 7(C)	No	No	10e/8g	75–29°	0.25 m (9.84 in)	58	65.5 mm × 61 mm (2.58 in × 2.40 in)	190 g (6.7 oz)	
ZUIKO DIGITAL ED 14-45mm F3.5-5.6	Olympus	14–45	f/3.5~5.6–22, 7	No	No	12e/10g	75–27°	0.38 m (14.96 in)	58	71 mm × 86.5 mm (2.80 in × 3.41 in)	285 g (10.1 oz)	
LEICA D VARIO-ELMARIT 14-50mm F2.8-3.5 ASPH. MEGA O.I.S.	Panasonic	14–50	f/2.8~3.5–22, 7	No	Yes	16e/12g	75–24°	0.29 m (11.42 in)	72	78.1 mm × 97.4 mm (3.07 in × 3.83 in)	490 g (17.3 oz)	
LEICA D VARIO-ELMAR 14-50mm F3.8-5.6 ASPH. MEGA O.I.S.	Panasonic	14–50	f/3.8~5.6–22, 7	No	Yes	15e/11g	75–24°	0.29 m (11.42 in)	67	78 mm × 84.5 mm (3.07 in × 3.33 in)	435 g (15.3 oz)	
ZUIKO DIGITAL 14-54mm F2.8-3.5	Olympus	14–54	f/2.8~3.5–22, 7	Yes	No	15e/11g	75–23°	0.22 m (8.66 in)	67	73.5 mm × 88.5 mm (2.89 in × 3.48 in)	435 g (15.3 oz)	
ZUIKO DIGITAL 14-54mm F2.8-3.5 II	Olympus	14–54	f/2.8~3.5–22, 7(C)	Yes	No	15e/11g	75–23°	0.22 m (8.66 in)	67	74.5 mm × 88.5 mm (2.93 in × 3.48 in)	440 g (15.5 oz)	
ZUIKO DIGITAL ED 17.5-45mm F3.5-5.6	Olympus	17.5–45	f/3.5~5.6–22, 7(C)	No	No	7e/7g	63–27°	0.28 m (11.02 in)	52	71 mm × 70 mm (2.80 in × 2.76 in)	210 g (7.4 oz)	Kit lens with E-500
18-50mm F2.8 EX DC MACRO	Sigma	18–50	f/2.8–22, 7	No	No	15e/13g	62–24°	0.2 m (7.87 in)	72	79 mm × 91.1 mm (3.11 in × 3.59 in)	525 g (18.5 oz)	
18-50mm F3.5-5.6 DC	Sigma	18–50	f/3.5~5.6–22, 7	No	No	8e/8g	62–24°	0.25 m (9.84 in)	58	67.5 mm × 67.8 mm (2.66 in × 2.67 in)	270 g (9.5 oz)	
18-125mm F3.5-5.6 DC	Sigma	18–125	f/3.5~5.6–22, 9	No	No	15e/14g	62–9.9°	0.5 m (19.69 in)	62	70 mm × 83 mm (2.76 in × 3.27 in)	520 g (18.3 oz)	
24mm F1.8 EX DG ASPHERICAL MACRO	Sigma	24	f/1.8–22, 9	No	No	10e/9g	49°	0.18 m (7.09 in)	77	83.6 mm × 87.9 mm (3.29 in × 3.46 in)	520 g (18.3 oz)	
LEICA D SUMMILUX 25mm F1.4 ASPH.	Panasonic	25	f/1.4–16, 7(C)	No	No	10e/9g	47°	0.38 m (14.96 in)	72	77.7 mm × 75 mm (3.06 in × 2.95 in)	510 g (18.0 oz)	
ZUIKO DIGITAL 25mm F2.8	Olympus	25	f/2.8–22, 7(C)	No	No	5e/4g	47°	0.2 m (7.87 in)	43	64 mm × 23.5 mm (2.52 in × 0.93 in)	96 g (3.4 oz)	
30mm F1.4 EX DC HSM	Sigma	30	f/1.4–16, 8	No	No	7e/7g	40°	0.4 m (15.75 in)	62	77.8 mm × 63.9 mm (3.06 in × 2.52 in)	410 g (14.5 oz)	
Superzoom lenses
LEICA D VARIO-ELMAR 14-150mm F3.5-5.6 ASPH. MEGA O.I.S.	Panasonic	14–150	f/3.5~5.6–22, 7	No	Yes	15e/11g	75–8.2°	0.5 m (19.69 in)	72	78.5 mm × 90.4 mm (3.09 in × 3.56 in)	535 g (18.9 oz)	
ZUIKO DIGITAL ED 18-180mm F3.5-6.3	Olympus	18–180	f/3.5~6.3–22, 7	No	No	15e/13g	62–6.9°	0.45 m (17.72 in)	62	78 mm × 84.5 mm (3.07 in × 3.33 in)	435 g (15.3 oz)	
Telephoto lenses
ZUIKO DIGITAL ED 35-100mm F2.0	Olympus	35–100	f/2.0–22, 9(C)	Yes	No	21e/18g	34–12°	1.4 m (55.12 in)	77	96.5 mm × 213.5 mm (3.80 in × 8.41 in)	1,650 g (58.2 oz)	
ZUIKO DIGITAL 40-150mm F3.5-4.5	Olympus	40–150	f/3.5~4.5–22, 7(C)	No	No	13e/10g	30–8.2°	1.5 m (59.06 in)	58	77 mm × 107 mm (3.03 in × 4.21 in)	425 g (15.0 oz)	
ZUIKO DIGITAL ED 40-150mm F4-5.6	Olympus	40–150	f/4.0~5.6–22, 7(C)	No	No	12e/9g	30–8.2°	1.4 m (55.12 in)	58	65.5 mm × 72 mm (2.58 in × 2.83 in)	220 g (7.8 oz)	
50mm F1.4 EX DG HSM	Sigma	50	f/1.4–16, 9	No	No	8e/6g	24°	0.45 m (17.72 in)	77	84.5 mm × 73.7 mm (3.33 in × 2.90 in)	530 g (18.7 oz)	
ZUIKO DIGITAL ED 50-200mm F2.8-3.5	Olympus	50–200	f/2.8~3.5–22, 9	Yes	No	16e/15g	24–6.2°	1.2 m (47.24 in)	67	83 mm × 157 mm (3.27 in × 6.18 in)	920 g (32.5 oz)	
ZUIKO DIGITAL ED 50-200mm F2.8-3.5 SWD	Olympus	50–200	f/2.8~3.5–22, 9(C)	Yes	No	16e/15g	24–6.2°	1.2 m (47.24 in)	67	86.5 mm × 157 mm (3.41 in × 6.18 in)	995 g (35.1 oz)	
APO 50-500mm F4.0-6.3 EX DG HSM	Sigma	50–500	f/4.0~6.3–22, 9	No	No	20e/16g	24–2.5°	1.0–3.0 m (39.37–118.11 in)	86	95 mm × 223.9 mm (3.74 in × 8.81 in)	1,830 g (64.6 oz)	
55-200mm F4.0-5.6 DC	Sigma	55–200	f/4.0~5.6–22, 8	No	No	12e/9g	22–2.5°	1.1 m (43.31 in)	55	71.5 mm × 92.5 mm (2.81 in × 3.64 in)	330 g (11.6 oz)	
APO 70-200mm F2.8 II EX DG MACRO HSM	Sigma	70–200	f/2.8–22, 9	No	No	18e/15g	18–6.2°	1.0 m (39.37 in)	77	86.5 mm × 189.8 mm (3.41 in × 7.47 in)	1,385 g (48.9 oz)	
ZUIKO DIGITAL ED 70-300mm F4.0-5.6	Olympus	70–300	f/4.0~5.6–22, 9(C)	No	No	14e/10g	18–4.1°	0.96–1.2 m (37.80–47.24 in)	58	80 mm × 127.5 mm (3.15 in × 5.02 in)	615 g (21.7 oz)	
ZUIKO DIGITAL ED 90-250mm F2.8	Olympus	90–250	f/2.8–22, 9(C)	Yes	No	17e/12g	14–5.0°	2.5 m (98.43 in)	105	124 mm × 276 mm (4.88 in × 10.87 in)	3,270 g (115.3 oz)	
APO 135-400mm F4.5-5.6 DG	Sigma	135–400	f/4.5~5.6–22, 9	No	No	13e/11g	9.2–3.1°	2.0–2.2 m (78.74–86.61 in)	77	83.5 mm × 189 mm (3.29 in × 7.44 in)	1,280 g (45.2 oz)	
ZUIKO DIGITAL ED 150mm F2.0	Olympus	150	f/2.0–22, 9(C)	Yes	No	11e/9g	8.2°	1.4 m (55.12 in)	82	100 mm × 150 mm (3.94 in × 5.91 in)	1,465 g (51.7 oz)	
ZUIKO DIGITAL ED 300mm F2.8	Olympus	300	f/2.8–22, 9	Yes	No	13e/11g	4.1°	2.4 m (94.49 in)	43(D)	127 mm × 285 mm (5.00 in × 11.22 in)	3,290 g (116.1 oz)	
APO 300-800mm F5.6 EX DG HSM	Sigma	300–800	f/5.6–32, 9	No	No	18e/16g	4.1–1.6°	6.0 m (236.22 in)	46(R)	156.5 mm × 549.4 mm (6.16 in × 21.63 in)	5,915 g (208.6 oz)	
Macro lenses
ZUIKO DIGITAL 35mm F3.5 Macro	Olympus	35	f/3.5–22, 7(C)	No	No	6e/6g	34°	0.146 m (5.75 in)	52	71 mm × 53 mm (2.80 in × 2.09 in)	165 g (5.8 oz)	
ZUIKO DIGITAL ED 50mm F2.0 Macro	Olympus	50	f/2.0–22, 7	Yes	No	11e/10g	24°	0.24 m (9.45 in)	52	71 mm × 61.5 mm (2.80 in × 2.42 in)	300 g (10.6 oz)	
MACRO 105mm F2.8 EX DG	Sigma	105	f/2.8–22, 8	No	No	11e/10g	12°	0.31 m (12.20 in)	58	74 mm × 102.9 mm (2.91 in × 4.05 in)	470 g (16.6 oz)	
APO MACRO 150mm F2.8 EX DG HSM	Sigma	150	f/2.8–22, 9	No	No	16e/12g	8.2°	0.38 m (14.96 in)	72	79.6 mm × 142.4 mm (3.13 in × 5.61 in)	920 g (32.5 oz)	
Teleconverters
ZUIKO DIGITAL 1.4× Teleconverter EC-14	Olympus	1.4×	1.4×	No	No	6e/5g	approx. ÷1.4	×1	—	68 mm × 22 mm (2.68 in × 0.87 in)	170 g (6.0 oz)	
ZUIKO DIGITAL 2.0× Teleconverter EC-20	Olympus	2.0×	2.0×	No	No	7e/5g	approx. ÷2	×1	—	68 mm × 41 mm (2.68 in × 1.61 in)	225 g (7.9 oz)	

== See also ==
- Lenses for SLR and DSLR cameras
- Lens mount — list of lens mounts
- Video camera tube § Size, origin of 4/3 inch sensor measurement

== Notes ==
Kind	Type	Focal length	Aperture	2000s							2010s							
Kind	Type	Focal length	Aperture	03	04	05	06	07	08	09	10	11	12	13	14	15	16	17
Prime	Fish-eye	8	3.5				Olympus Zuiko Digital 8mm F3.5											
Prime	Norm.	24	1.8				Sigma 24mm F1.8 EX DG											
Prime	Norm.	25	1.4					Leica D Summilux 25mm F1.4 ASPH										
Prime	Norm.	25	2.8						Olympus Zuiko Digital 25mm F2.8									
Prime	Norm.	30	1.4				Sigma 30mm F1.4 EX DC HSM											
Prime	Norm.	35	3.5			Olympus Zuiko Digital 35mm F3.5 Macro												
Prime	Tele	50	1.4						Sigma 50mm F1.4 EX DG HSM									
Prime	Tele	50	2.0	Olympus Zuiko Digital ED 50mm F2.0 Macro														
Prime	Tele	105	2.8				Sigma 105mm F2.8 EX DG Macro											
Prime	Tele	150	2.0							Olympus Zuiko Digital ED 150mm F2								
Prime	Tele	150	2.8				Sigma 150mm F2.8 EX DG APO Macro HSM											
Prime	Super tele	300	2.8		Olympus Zuiko Digital ED 300mm F2.8													
Zoom	UWA	7-14	4.0			Olympus Zuiko Digital ED 7-14mm F4												
Zoom	UWA	9-18	4–5.6						Olympus Zuiko Digital ED 9-18mm F4-5.6									
Zoom	UWA	10-20	4–5.6						Sigma 10-20mm F4.0-5.6 EX DC HSM									
Zoom	UWA	11-22	2.8–3.5		Olympus Zuiko Digital 11-22mm F2.8-3.5													
Zoom	Std.	12-60	2.8–4							Olympus Zuiko Digital ED 12-60mm F2.8-4 SWD								
Zoom	Std.	14-xx	2.0			Olympus Zuiko Digital ED 14-35mm f/2.0 SWD												
Zoom	Std.	14-xx	2.8-3.5	Olympus Zuiko Digital 14-54mm F2.8-3.5					Olympus Zuiko Digital 14-54mm F2.8-3.5 II									
Zoom	Std.	14-xx	2.8-3.5						Leica D Vario-Elmarit 14-50mm F2.8-3.5 ASPH									
Zoom	Std.	14-xx	3.5-5.6		Olympus Zuiko Digital 14-45mm F3.5-5.6													
Zoom	Std.	14-xx	3.5-5.6					Leica D Vario-Elmar 14-150mm F3.5-5.6 ASPH										
Zoom	Std.	14-xx	3.8-5.6				Leica D Vario-Elmar 14-50mm F3.8-5.6 ASPH											
Zoom	Std.	17,5-45	3.5-5.6			Olympus Zuiko Digital 17.5-45mm F3.5-5.6												
Zoom	Std.	18-50	2.8				Sigma 18-50mm F2.8 EX DC											
Zoom	Std.	18-50	3.5-5.6		Sigma 18-50mm F3.5-5.6 DC													
Zoom	Std.	18-125	3.5-5.6				Sigma 18-125mm F3.5-5.6 DC											
Zoom	Std.	18-180	3.5–6.3				Olympus Zuiko Digital ED 18-180mm F3.5-6.3											
Zoom	Tele	35-100	2.0			Olympus Zuiko Digital ED 35-100mm F2												
Zoom	Tele	50-500	4.0-6.3							Sigma 50-500mm F4-6.3 EX DG HSM								
Zoom	Tele	5x-200	2.8-3.5	Olympus Zuiko Digital ED 50-200mm f/2.8-3.5				Olympus Zuiko Digital ED 50-200mm F2.8-3.5 SWD										
Zoom	Tele	5x-200	4-5.6						Sigma 55-200mm F4-5.6 DC									
Zoom	Tele	70-200	2.8							Sigma 70-200mm F2.8 EX DG Macro II HSM								
Zoom	Tele	70-300	4-5.6					Olympus Zuiko Digital ED 70-300mm F4-5.6										
Zoom	Tele	40-150	3.5-4.5		Olympus Zuiko Digital 40-150mm F3.5-4.5													
Zoom	Tele	40-150	4-5.6				Olympus Zuiko Digital ED 40-150mm F4-5.6											
Zoom	Super Tele	90-250	2.8			Olympus Zuiko Digital ED 90-250mm F2.8												
Zoom	Super Tele	135-400	4.5-5.6					Sigma 135-400mm F4.5-5.6 DG APO										
Zoom	Super Tele	300-800	5.6					Sigma 300-800mm F5.6 EX DG HSM APO										
Teleconverter					Olympus Zuiko Digital 1.4x Teleconverter EC-14													
Teleconverter					Olympus Zuiko Digital 2x Teleconverter EC-20													
Extension tube					Olympus Extension Tube EX-25													
Kind	Type	Focal length	Aperture	03	04	05	06	07	08	09	10	11	12	13	14	15	16	17
Kind	Type	Focal length	Aperture	2000s							2010s							

	2003	2004	2005	2006	2007	2008	2009	2010	2011	2012	2013
Flagship		E-1				E-3			E-5		
High-end							E-30				
Midrange							E-620				
Midrange								E-600			
Midrange				E-500	E-510		E-520				
Entry-level			E-300	E-330			E-450				
Entry-level				E-400	E-410		E-420				
