= Olympus Zuiko Digital 17.5-45mm f/3.5-5.6 =

Olympus Zuiko Digital 17.5-45mm F3.5-5.6
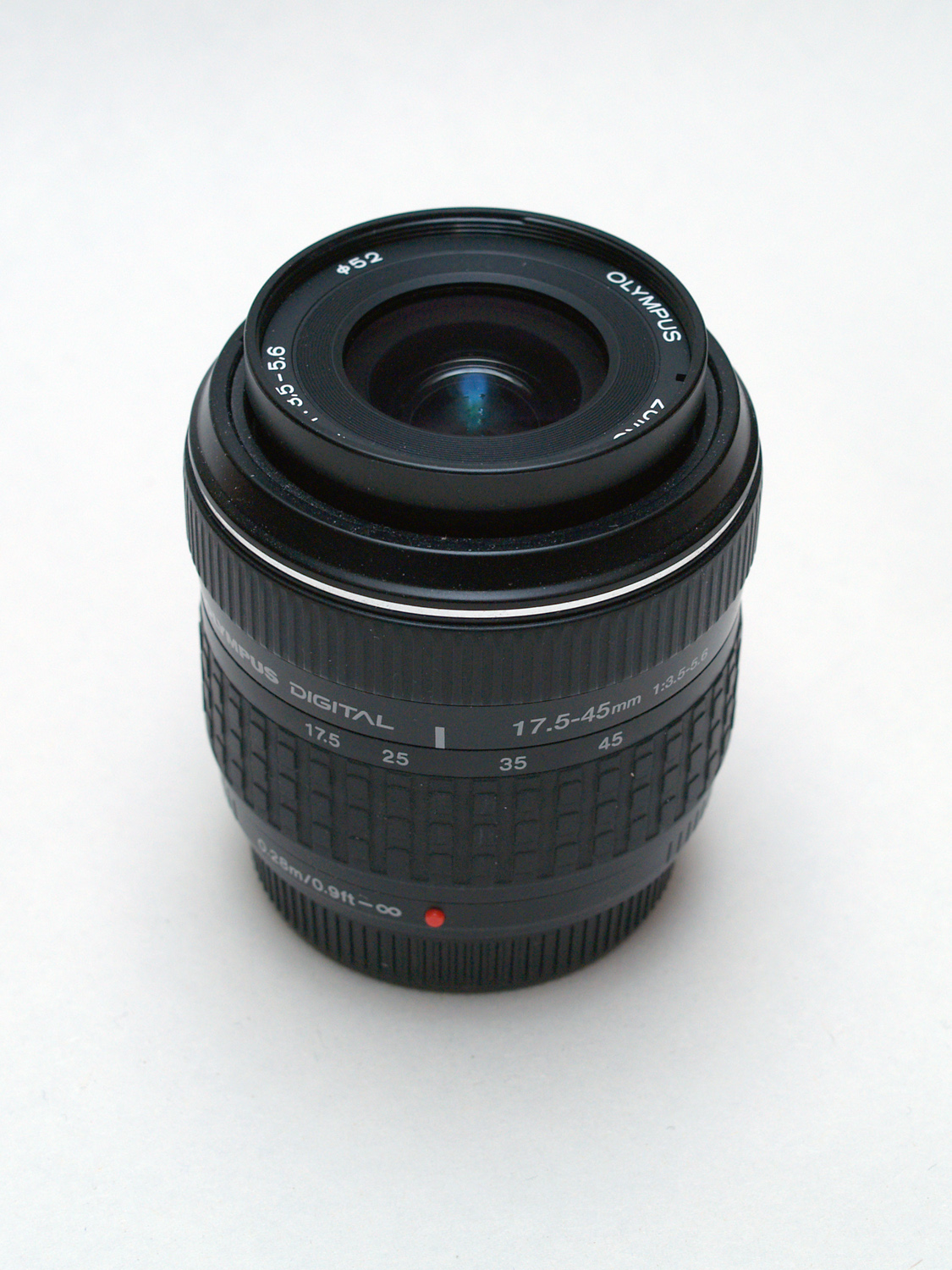
- Maker: Olympus
- Lens mount(s): Four Thirds system

Technical data
- Type: Zoom
- Focus drive: Micromotor
- Focal length: 18-45mm
- Aperture (max/min): f/3.5 - f/5.6
- Close focus distance: 0.28 metres (0.92 ft)
- Max. magnification: 0.23
- Diaphragm blades: 7
- Construction: 7 elements in 7 groups

Features
- Manual focus override: No No
- Weather-sealing: No No
- Lens-based stabilization: No No
- Aperture ring: No No

Physical
- Diameter: 71 millimetres (2.8 in)
- Weight: 210 grams (0.46 lb)
- Filter diameter: 52mm

History
- Introduction: 2005

The Olympus Zuiko Digital 17.5-45mm F3.5-5.6 is an interchangeable camera lens announced by Olympus Corporation on September 26, 2005.

Kind	Type	Focal length	Aperture	2000s							2010s							
Kind	Type	Focal length	Aperture	03	04	05	06	07	08	09	10	11	12	13	14	15	16	17
Prime	Fish-eye	8	3.5				Olympus Zuiko Digital 8mm F3.5											
Prime	Norm.	24	1.8				Sigma 24mm F1.8 EX DG											
Prime	Norm.	25	1.4					Leica D Summilux 25mm F1.4 ASPH										
Prime	Norm.	25	2.8						Olympus Zuiko Digital 25mm F2.8									
Prime	Norm.	30	1.4				Sigma 30mm F1.4 EX DC HSM											
Prime	Norm.	35	3.5			Olympus Zuiko Digital 35mm F3.5 Macro												
Prime	Tele	50	1.4						Sigma 50mm F1.4 EX DG HSM									
Prime	Tele	50	2.0	Olympus Zuiko Digital ED 50mm F2.0 Macro														
Prime	Tele	105	2.8				Sigma 105mm F2.8 EX DG Macro											
Prime	Tele	150	2.0							Olympus Zuiko Digital ED 150mm F2								
Prime	Tele	150	2.8				Sigma 150mm F2.8 EX DG APO Macro HSM											
Prime	Super tele	300	2.8		Olympus Zuiko Digital ED 300mm F2.8													
Zoom	UWA	7-14	4.0			Olympus Zuiko Digital ED 7-14mm F4												
Zoom	UWA	9-18	4–5.6						Olympus Zuiko Digital ED 9-18mm F4-5.6									
Zoom	UWA	10-20	4–5.6						Sigma 10-20mm F4.0-5.6 EX DC HSM									
Zoom	UWA	11-22	2.8–3.5		Olympus Zuiko Digital 11-22mm F2.8-3.5													
Zoom	Std.	12-60	2.8–4							Olympus Zuiko Digital ED 12-60mm F2.8-4 SWD								
Zoom	Std.	14-xx	2.0			Olympus Zuiko Digital ED 14-35mm f/2.0 SWD												
Zoom	Std.	14-xx	2.8-3.5	Olympus Zuiko Digital 14-54mm F2.8-3.5					Olympus Zuiko Digital 14-54mm F2.8-3.5 II									
Zoom	Std.	14-xx	2.8-3.5						Leica D Vario-Elmarit 14-50mm F2.8-3.5 ASPH									
Zoom	Std.	14-xx	3.5-5.6		Olympus Zuiko Digital 14-45mm F3.5-5.6													
Zoom	Std.	14-xx	3.5-5.6					Leica D Vario-Elmar 14-150mm F3.5-5.6 ASPH										
Zoom	Std.	14-xx	3.8-5.6				Leica D Vario-Elmar 14-50mm F3.8-5.6 ASPH											
Zoom	Std.	17,5-45	3.5-5.6			Olympus Zuiko Digital 17.5-45mm F3.5-5.6												
Zoom	Std.	18-50	2.8				Sigma 18-50mm F2.8 EX DC											
Zoom	Std.	18-50	3.5-5.6		Sigma 18-50mm F3.5-5.6 DC													
Zoom	Std.	18-125	3.5-5.6				Sigma 18-125mm F3.5-5.6 DC											
Zoom	Std.	18-180	3.5–6.3				Olympus Zuiko Digital ED 18-180mm F3.5-6.3											
Zoom	Tele	35-100	2.0			Olympus Zuiko Digital ED 35-100mm F2												
Zoom	Tele	50-500	4.0-6.3							Sigma 50-500mm F4-6.3 EX DG HSM								
Zoom	Tele	5x-200	2.8-3.5	Olympus Zuiko Digital ED 50-200mm f/2.8-3.5				Olympus Zuiko Digital ED 50-200mm F2.8-3.5 SWD										
Zoom	Tele	5x-200	4-5.6						Sigma 55-200mm F4-5.6 DC									
Zoom	Tele	70-200	2.8							Sigma 70-200mm F2.8 EX DG Macro II HSM								
Zoom	Tele	70-300	4-5.6					Olympus Zuiko Digital ED 70-300mm F4-5.6										
Zoom	Tele	40-150	3.5-4.5		Olympus Zuiko Digital 40-150mm F3.5-4.5													
Zoom	Tele	40-150	4-5.6				Olympus Zuiko Digital ED 40-150mm F4-5.6											
Zoom	Super Tele	90-250	2.8			Olympus Zuiko Digital ED 90-250mm F2.8												
Zoom	Super Tele	135-400	4.5-5.6					Sigma 135-400mm F4.5-5.6 DG APO										
Zoom	Super Tele	300-800	5.6					Sigma 300-800mm F5.6 EX DG HSM APO										
Teleconverter					Olympus Zuiko Digital 1.4x Teleconverter EC-14													
Teleconverter					Olympus Zuiko Digital 2x Teleconverter EC-20													
Extension tube					Olympus Extension Tube EX-25													
Kind	Type	Focal length	Aperture	03	04	05	06	07	08	09	10	11	12	13	14	15	16	17
Kind	Type	Focal length	Aperture	2000s							2010s							
