= Live MOS =

Type of image sensor

The Live MOS sensor is a trademark of Olympus Imaging Corp, and later OM Digital Solutions Corp, for an image sensor used by Panasonic, Olympus, and Leica in their Four Thirds System DSLR manufactured since 2006. (Olympus E-330, Panasonic Lumix DMC-L1 and Leica Digilux 3).

It originally referred specifically to an NMOS sensor but was later used to refer to CMOS, BSI CMOS, and stacked BSI CMOS sensors so appears to generally reference active pixel sensors.

Due to low energy consumption, it became possible to add the live preview function to all the Four Thirds System cameras since 2006 (except the Olympus E-400 and E-500).

Also, In order to reduce the image noise problem found in the first generation of Four Thirds DSLR cameras, (Olympus E-1, E-300, E-400 and E-500) which used FFT CCD sensors (due to smaller sensor size compared to the APS-C size), the Live MOS chip includes a noise-reduction technology.

The Live MOS name has also been used to refer to the sensors in Panasonic, Olympus, and OM System Micro Four Thirds System cameras.
