= Panasonic Lumix DMC-L10 =

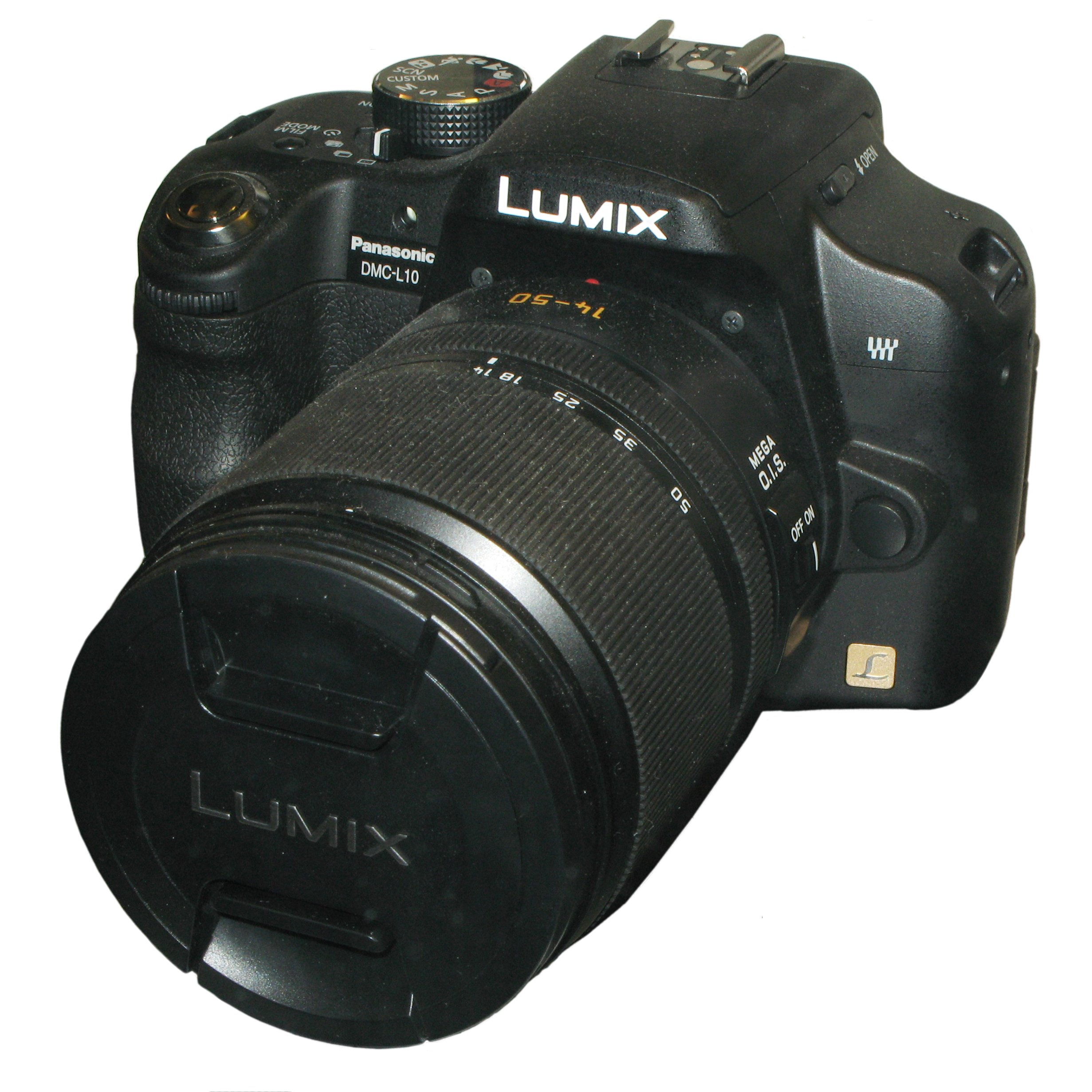

Overview
- Maker: Panasonic Holdings Corporation
- Type: Digital single-lens reflex

Lens
- Lens: Interchangeable Four Thirds mount

Sensor/medium
- Sensor: 17.3 x 13.0 mm Four Thirds System RGB Live MOS sensor 2x FOV crop
- Maximum resolution: 3648 x 2736 (10.1 effective Megapixels)
- Film speed: 100 - 1600
- Storage media: Secure Digital, SDHC, MultiMediaCard

Focusing
- Focus modes: AFS / AFC / MF
- Focus areas: 3-point TTL Phase Difference Detection System, Contrast AF system: 9-point

Exposure/metering
- Exposure modes: Program automatic Aperture automatic Shutter automatic Manual setting
- Exposure metering: TTL
- Metering modes: Intelligent Multiple / Center Weighted / Spot; 49 zone metering (use viewfinder); 25 zones metering (EVF)

Flash
- Flash: Built in Pop-up, GN11 (ISO100,m), hotshoe TTL Auto with FL360 / FL500 (Optional)

Shutter
- Shutter: Focal-plane shutter
- Shutter speed range: 1/4000 sec - 60 sec Bulb mode (up to approx. 8 minutes); 1/160s X sync
- Continuous shooting: 2 or 3 frame/s up to 3 RAW images or ∞ JPEG (depending on memory card size, battery power, picture size, and compression)

Viewfinder
- Viewfinder: 95% Field of View, Optical 0.92x Magnification, 14mm Eyepoint Penta Mirror Optical Viewfinder

Image processing
- White balance: auto, daylight, cloudy skies, shadow, halogen, flash, manual 1+2 & color temperature setting (2500 K to 10000 K in 31 steps) fine tuning: blue/amber bias; magenta/green bias

General
- LCD screen: 2.5" (63.5 mm) TFT LCD, 207,000 pixels
- Battery: Li-ion Battery Pack (7.2 V, 1320 mAh) DMW-BLA13PP
- Weight: approx. 480g

The Lumix DMC-L10 is Panasonic's second digital single-lens reflex camera (DSLR), a follow-up to the previous Lumix DMC-L1 model. It was announced in August 2007, and, like the Lumix DMC-L1, this model uses the Four Thirds System lens mount standard and contains some basic parts provided by Olympus. (Its siblings are the Olympus E-410 and E-510, all three cameras sharing some of the same basic internals.)

A new kit lens bearing the Leica label was introduced with this camera, the Leica D Vario-Elmar 14–50mm/ F3.8–5.6/ASPH MEGA OIS. As the name implies, it features optical image stabilization. Panasonic also announced a new Leica-labeled 14–150 mm superzoom lens for the Four Thirds standard, also with optical image stabilization.

== Features ==
The Lumix DMC-L10 featured improvements to the live view facility, permitting the image to be previewed on the LCD screen when composing the shot. The Lumix DMC-L10 has a second-generation live view function that allows autofocus with live view turned on, and without the mirror moving up and down, although only with certain lenses. Even more important, the Lumix DMC-L10 is the first DSLR camera with a fully articulating LCD monitor and live view system, allowing the user to hold the camera at pretty much any angle while still being able to see the LCD.

Other features provided in live view mode (and only in live view mode) are face detection and automatic adjustment of the ISO and shutter speed if motion is detected in the subject to be photographed.

Like all other Four Thirds DSLRs, the Lumix DMC-L10 employs a Supersonic Wave Filter (SSWF) system to combat dust entering the body. This system was rated by some as the best dust reduction system currently available on DSLRs.

== Gallery ==
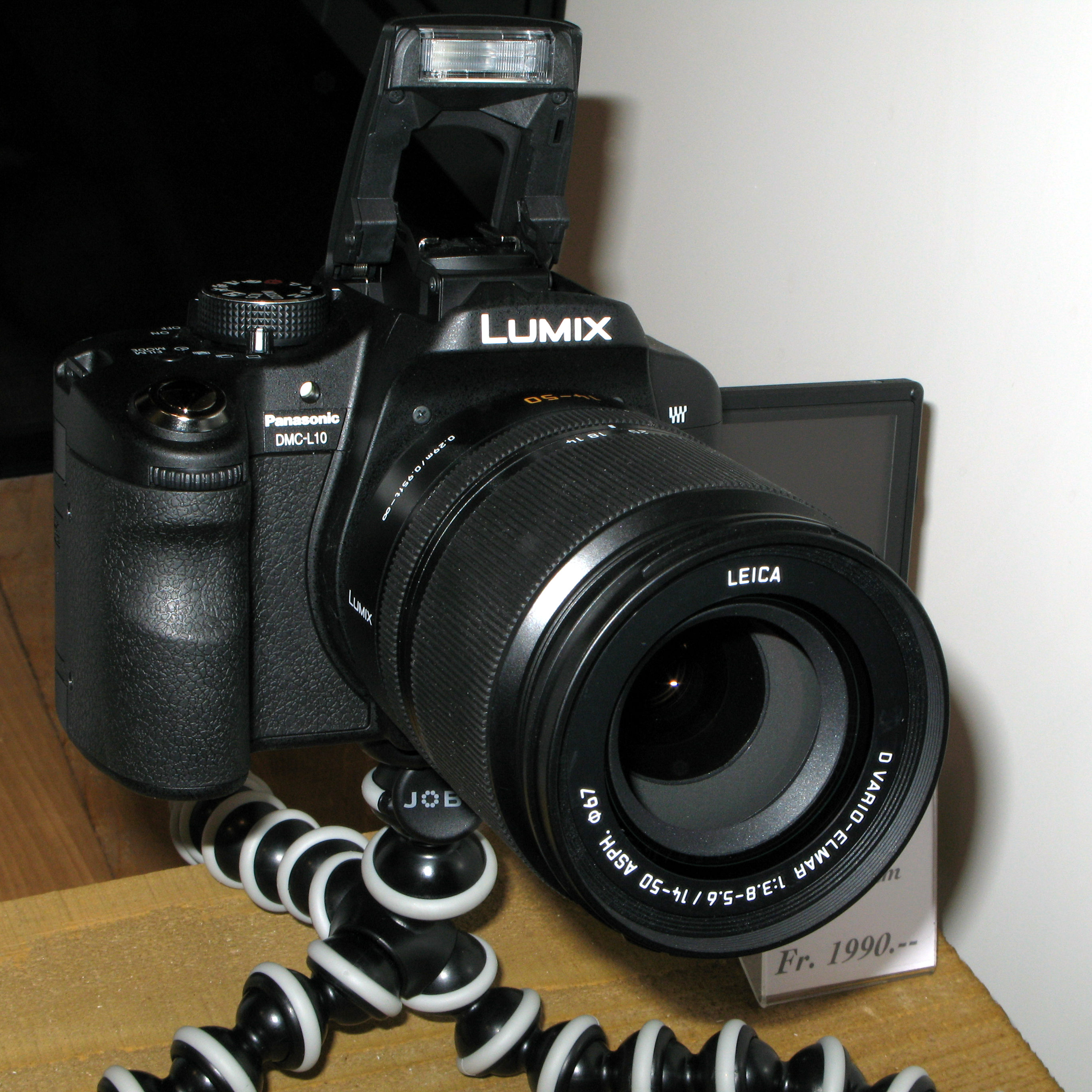

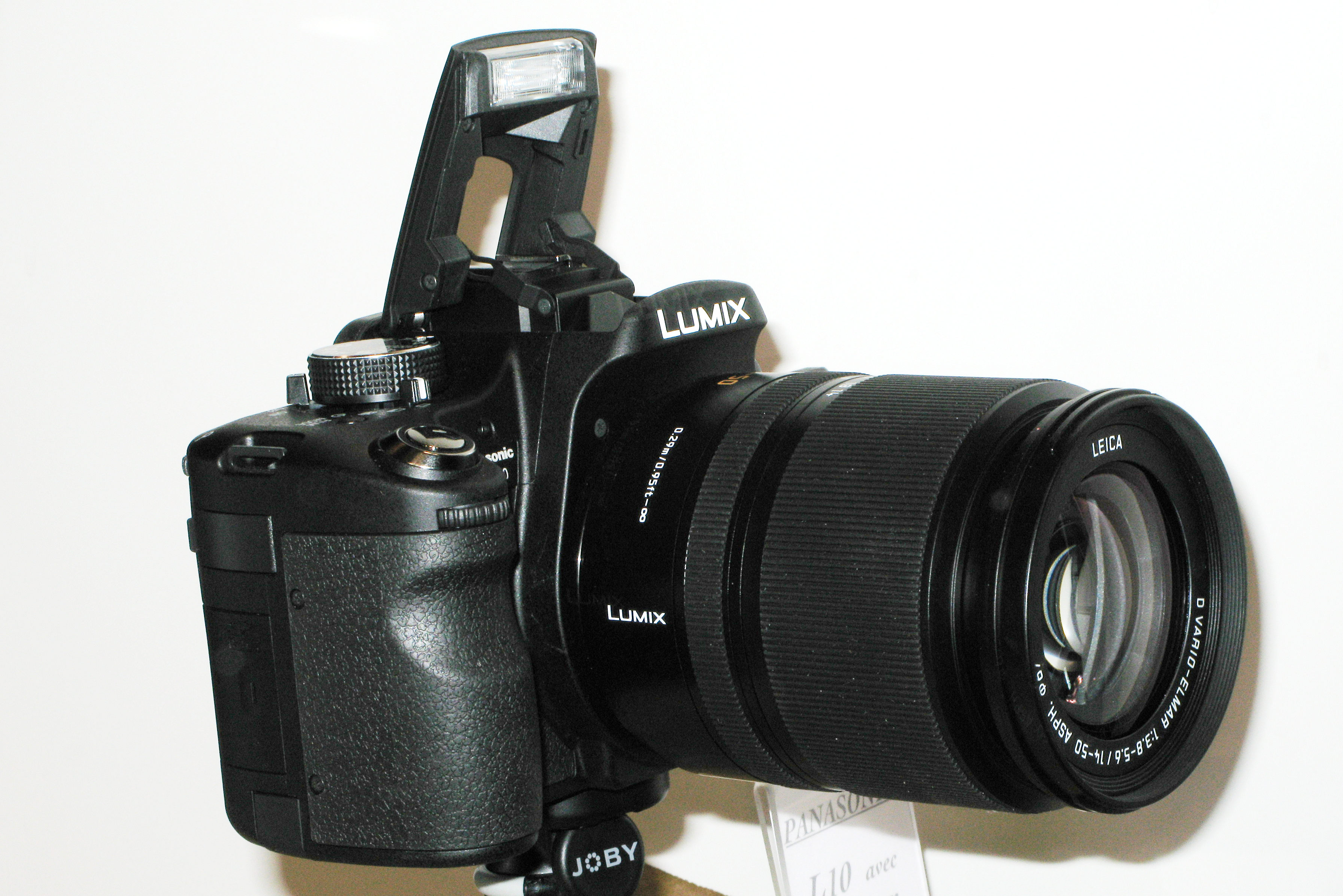
