= Sony Alpha 350 =

Sony α350
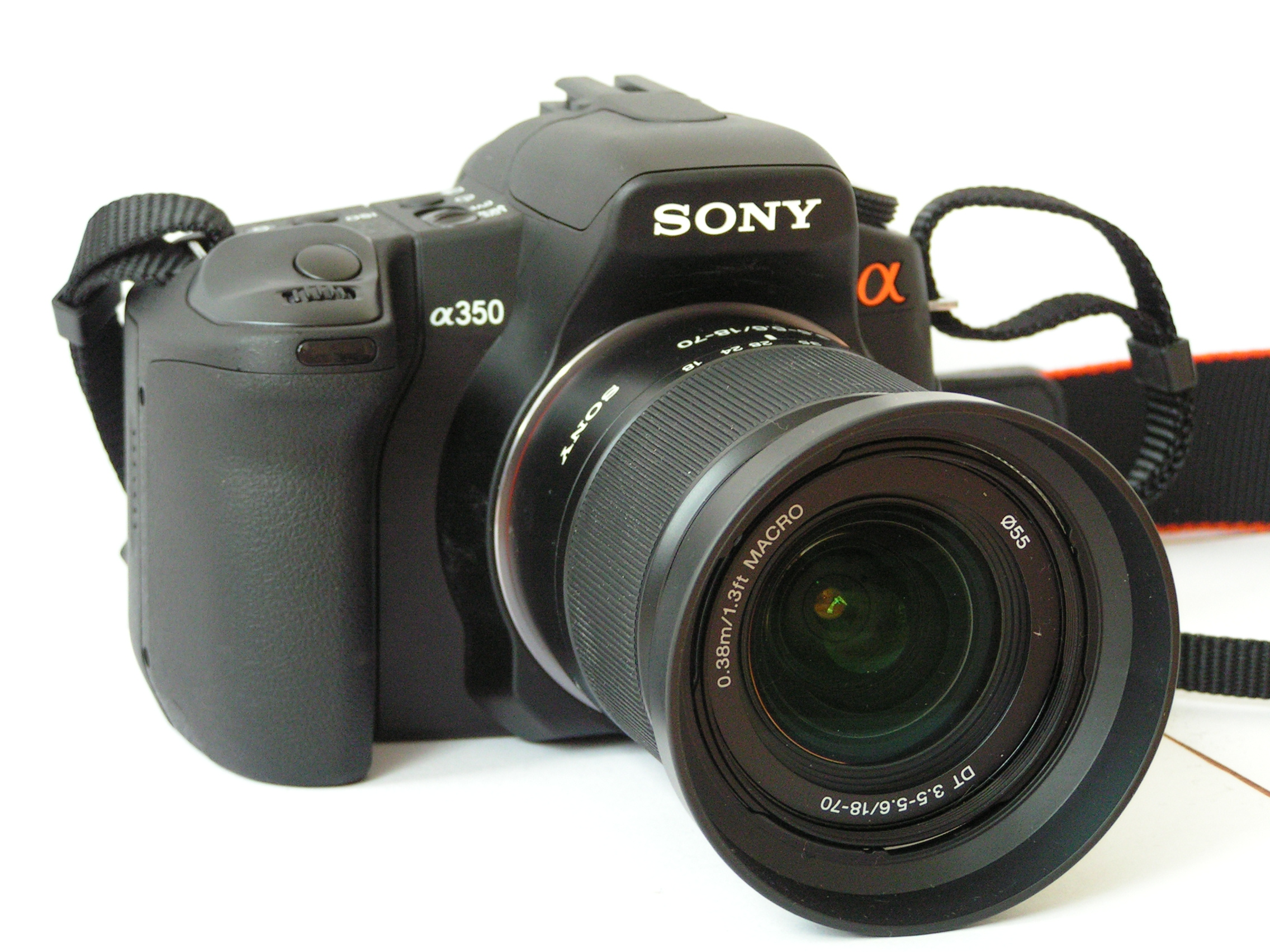

Overview
- Maker: Sony
- Type: Digital single-lens reflex camera

Lens
- Lens: interchangeable, Sony α / Konica Minolta A mount

Sensor/medium
- Sensor: 23,5 mm × 15,7 mm, 14.2 effective megapixels CCD
- Maximum resolution: 4592 × 3056 pixels
- Film speed: Auto, 100, 200, 400, 800, 1600, 3200
- Storage media: CompactFlash I/II, Memory Stick PRO Duo (with adapter), Microdrive

Exposure/metering
- Exposure metering: 40-segment honeycomb-pattern
- Metering modes: Multi-segment, Center-weighted, Spot

Flash
- Flash: Manual Pop-up: Auto, Fill-flash, Slow sync., Rear flash sync, Wireless off camera flash

Shutter
- Shutter: electronically controlled, vertical-traverse, focal-plane Shutter
- Shutter speed range: 30–1/4000 sec, with Bulb, 1/160 sec X-sync
- Continuous shooting: 2.44 Frames Per Second

Viewfinder
- Viewfinder: Fixed eye-level penta-Dach-mirror, 0.95 Field of View, Diopter Adjustment -3.0 to + 1.0

Image processing
- White balance: Auto, daylight, shade, cloudy, Tungsten, fluorescent, flash, color temperature, custom
- WB bracketing: 3 frames

General
- LCD screen: 230k pixel 2.7-inch TFT LCD
- Battery: 7.2 V, 1650 mAh (Sony NP-FM500H)
- Weight: 582 g (20.5 oz) without battery and memorycard, 682 g (24.1 oz) with lens, battery and card.
- Made in: Japan

The Sony α 350 (DSLR-A350) is a digital single-lens reflex camera (DSLR) being replaced from 2009 by the similarly specified Sony α 380. It features live view and body-integrated image stabilization.

== Details ==
The Sony α 350 was introduced in Japan in March 2008. It has a 14.2 megapixel CCD sensor, the second highest pixel count for an APS-C format DSLR at the time of its launch, marginally exceeded by the Pentax K20D CMOS sensor.

The Live View is provided by a secondary low-resolution video sensor placed in the mirror-prism housing to provide a view of the focusing screen, which allows retention of phase-contrast autofocus. Live View is mechanically switched via a moving mirror surface. When Live View is active, the normal exposure metering is replaced by metering from the LV image itself offering many more zones or points, along with more accurate white balance. This system is shared with the Sony Alpha 300, a 10.2 megapixel variant.

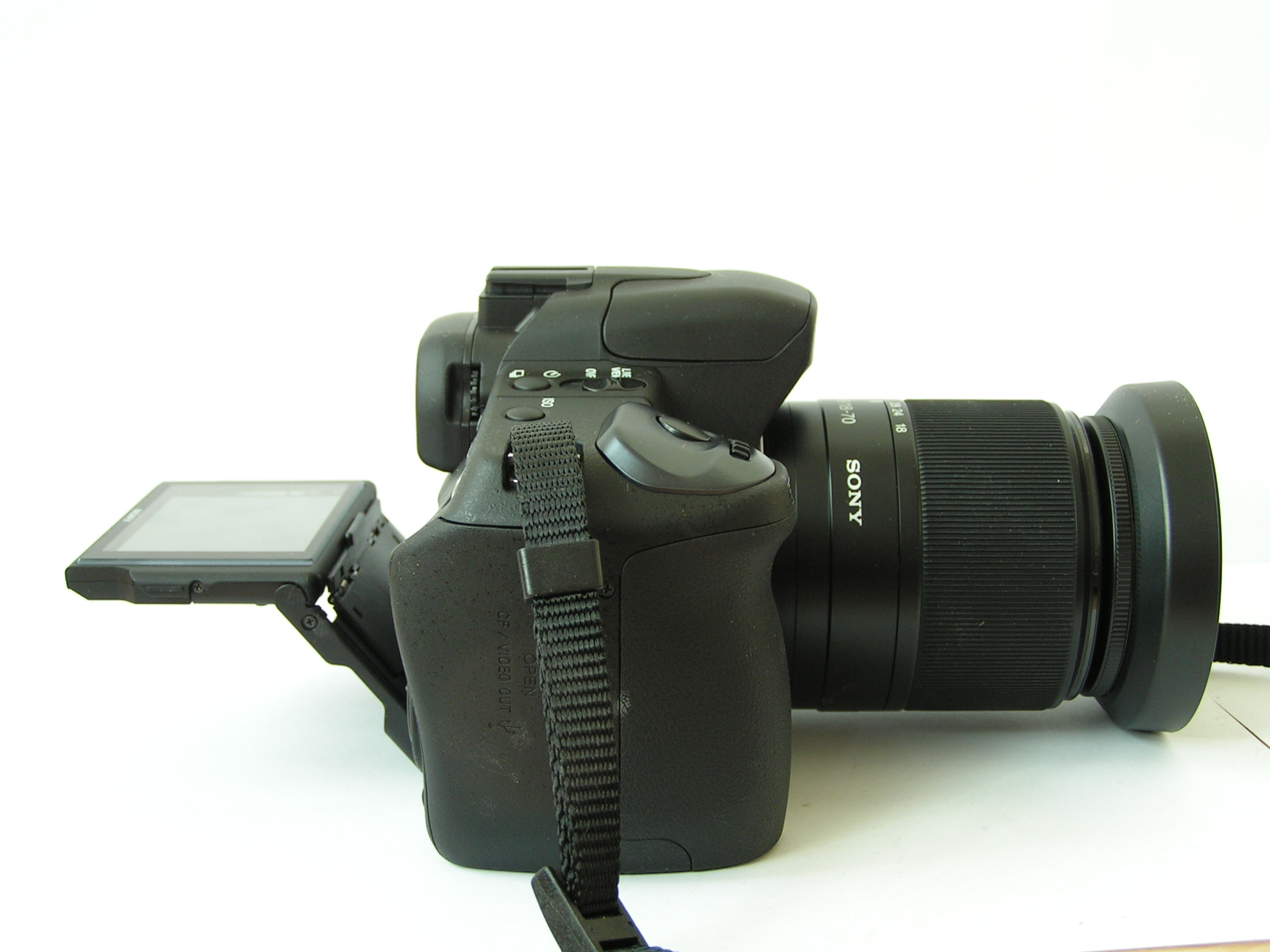
Sideview of the α 350 with liveview screen

| Level | Sensor | 2004 | 2005 | 2006 | 2007 | 2008 | 2009 | 2010 | 2011 | | 2012 | 2013 | 2014 | 2015 | 2016 | 2017 | 2018 | 2019 | 2020 |
| Professional | Full frame | | | | | | α900 | | | | | α99 | | | | α99 II | | | |
| Professional | Full frame | | | | | | | α850 | | | | | | | | | | | |
| High-end | APS-C | | DG-7D | | | α700 | | | | α77 | | | | α77 II | | | | | |
| Midrange | APS-C | | | | | | | | | α65 | | | | | α68 | | | | |
| Upper-entry | APS-C | | | | | | | | α55 | | α57 | | | | | | | | |
| Upper-entry | APS-C | | | | α100 | | | α550 ^{F} | α580 | | | | α58 | | | | | | |
| Upper-entry | APS-C | | DG-5D | | | | | α500 | α560 | | | | | | | | | | |
| Upper-entry | APS-C | | | | | | | α450 | | | | | | | | | | | |
| Entry-level | APS-C | | | | | | | | α33 | α35 | α37 | | | | | | | | |
| Entry-level | APS-C | | | | | α350 ^{F} | | α380 | α390 | | | | | | | | | | |
| Entry-level | APS-C | | | | | α300 | | α330 | | | | | | | | | | | |
| Entry-level | APS-C | | | | | α200 | | α230 | α290 | | | | | | | | | | |
| Early models | Minolta 7000 with SB-70/SB-70S (1986) · Minolta 9000 with SB-90/SB-90S (1986) (Still video SLRs); Minolta MS-C1100 (1992) · Minolta RD-175 (1995) | | | | | | | | | | | | | | | | | | |
| Level | Sensor | | | | | | | | | | | | | | | | | | |
| Level | Sensor | 2004 | 2005 | 2006 | 2007 | 2008 | 2009 | 2010 | 2011 | | 2012 | 2013 | 2014 | 2015 | 2016 | 2017 | 2018 | 2019 | 2020 |
