= Single-lens reflex camera =

Camera that typically uses a mirror and prism system

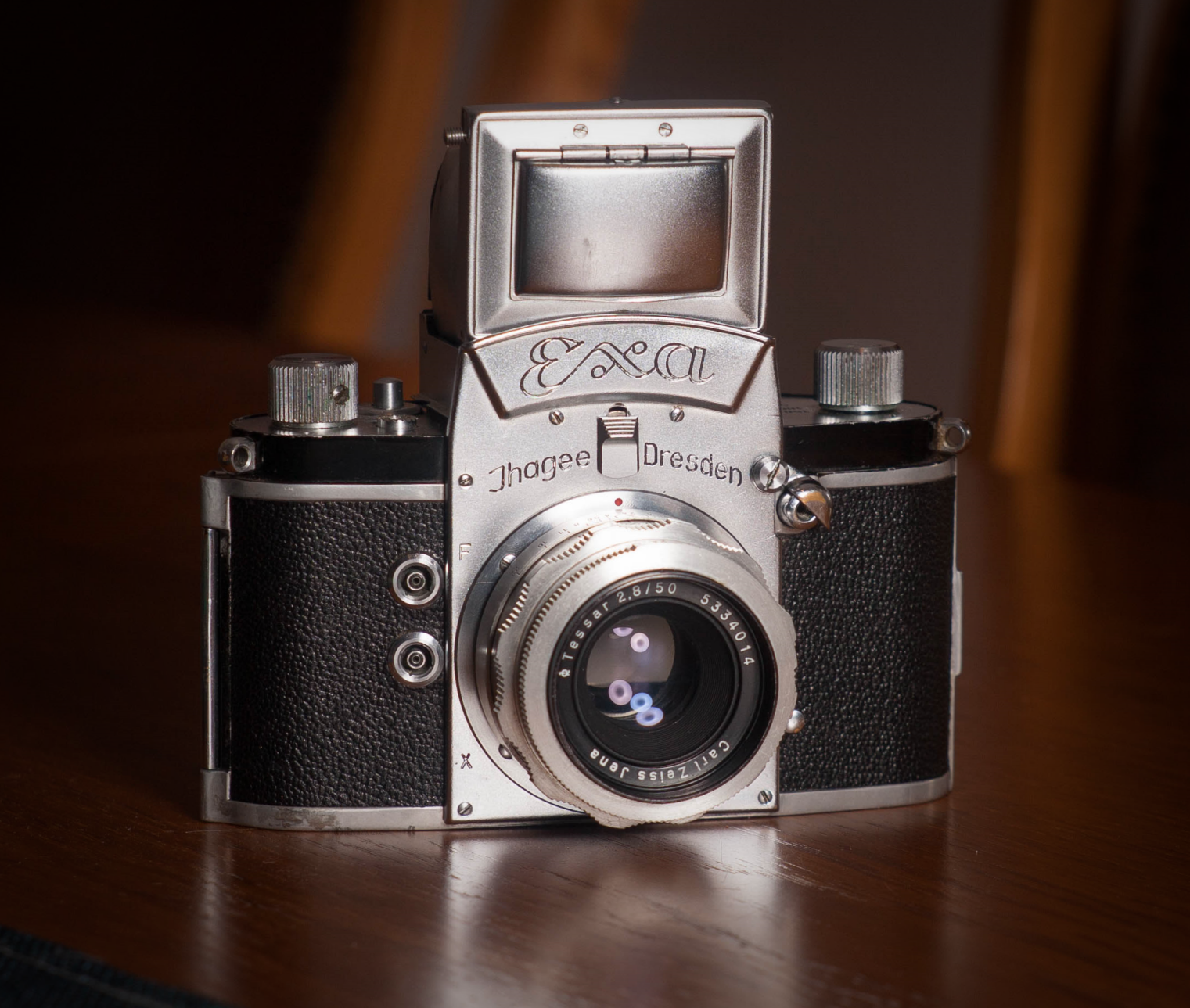
Ihagee Exa Single lens reflex

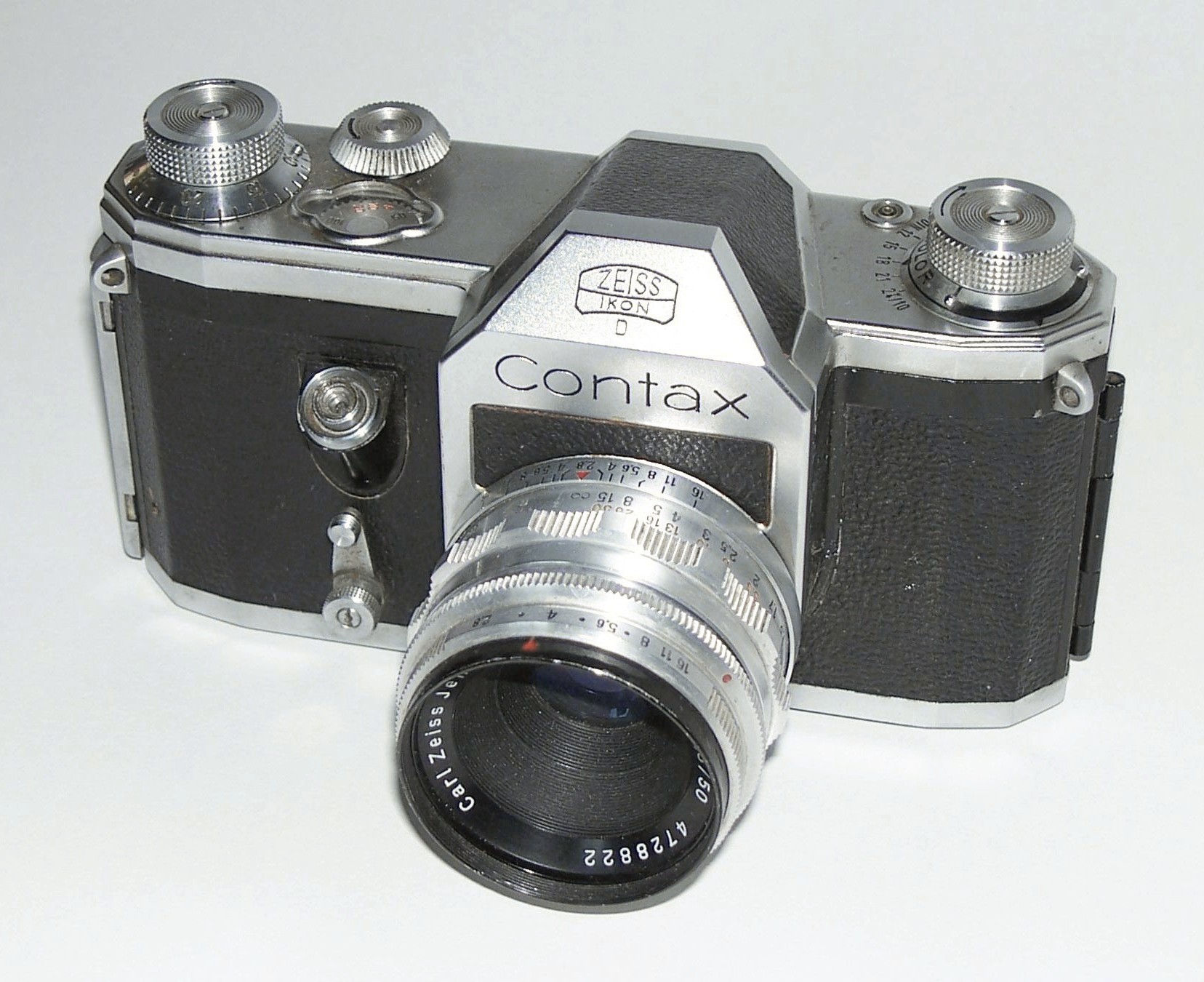
The Zeiss Ikon VEB Contax S, manufactured in Dresden, one of the two original pentaprism SLRs for eye-level viewing that went into production in 1949. The Italian Rectaflex offered its first production SLR, the series 1000, the same year.

In photography, a single-lens reflex (SLR) camera is a type of still picture camera that uses the same lens for the viewfinder as it does to record the picture. Thus, the photographer sees exactly the same image as the film or sensor receives during exposure. Almost all SLRs use a mirror and prism to reflect incoming light (reflex), diverting the light out of the image capture path and into the viewfinder. When the picture is taken, the mirror moves out of the way, allowing the exposure to be captured.

The SLR design is in contrast to older designs such as twin-lens reflex (TLR) and rangefinder cameras, where the main lens is used only to record the photograph, and the photographer sees the preview via a separate mechanism. Because the photographer did not "see the same picture as the camera", unexpected differences could lead to the photograph looking significantly different than expected.

SLRs were first introduced in the 1930s, gained popularity in the 1960s, and became widespread in the 1970s. They were the dominant type of still camera through the 1980s into the 2010s. The vast majority of professional cameras in this era were SLR, and they also enjoyed great success in the mid-tier and high-end amateur markets. Starting in the 1990s the digital SLR (DSLR) began to become viable. DSLRs replaced traditional film with digital camera electronics, but kept the SLR mechanism and viewfinder. Within the decade of the 2000s, digital had largely taken over, but (D)SLR was still dominant. It was not until the 2010s that mirrorless interchangeable-lens cameras — which use a purely electronic viewfinder, with the sensor always active — began to make serious inroads into (D)SLR market territory. By 2020, all major manufacturers had ceased new development of SLR-based cameras, although the large base of existing owners and used equipment was keeping the DSLR in active use as of 2025.

== History ==
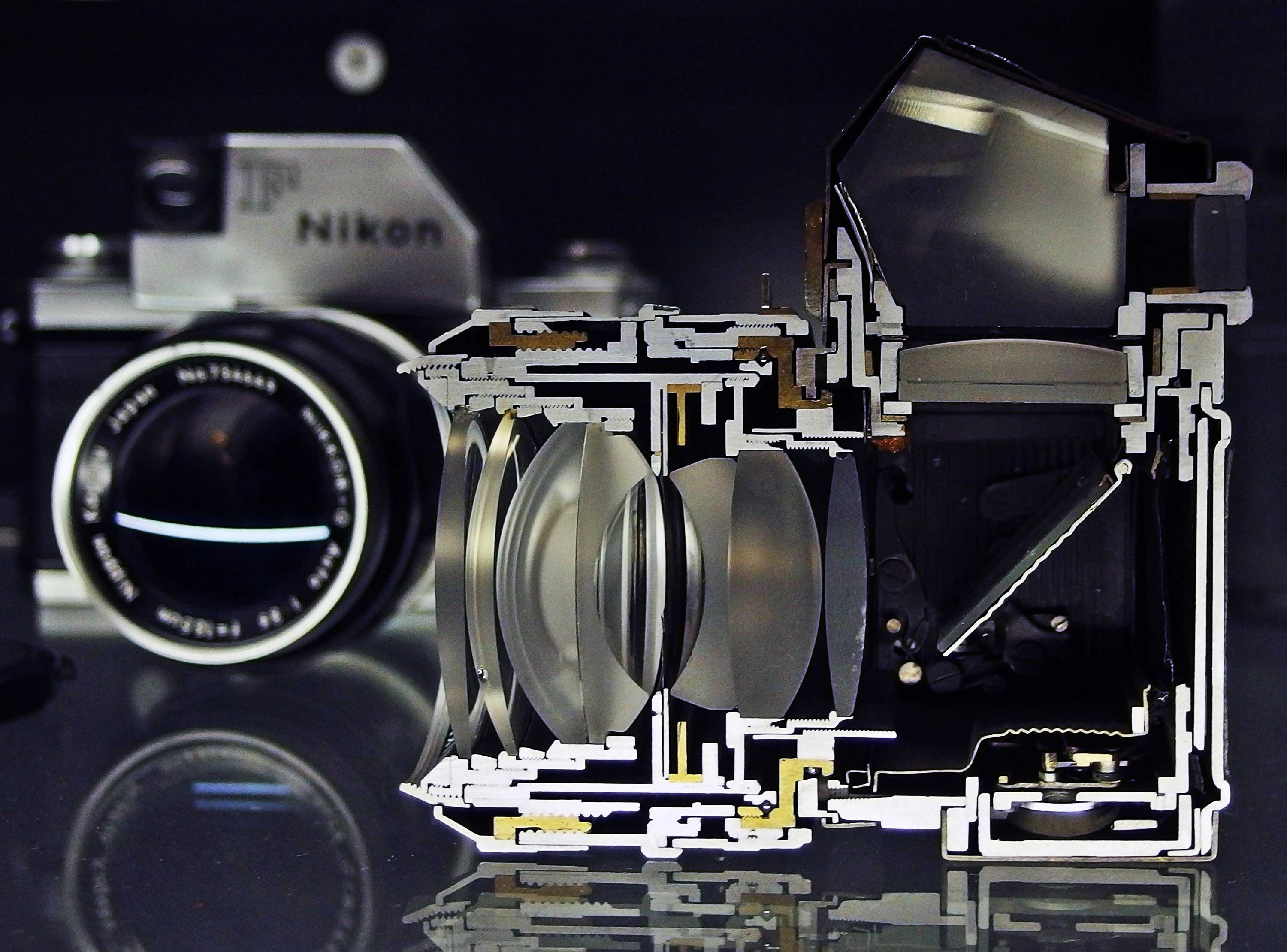
Cross section of SLR camera

Until the development of SLR, all cameras with viewfinders had two optical light paths: one through the lens to the film and another positioned above (TLR or twin-lens reflex) or to the side (rangefinder). Because the viewfinder and the film lens cannot share the same optical path, the viewing lens is aimed to intersect with the film lens at a fixed point somewhere in front of the camera. This is not problematic for pictures taken at a middle or longer distance, but parallax causes framing errors in close-up shots. Moreover, it is not easy to focus the lens of a fast reflex camera when it is opened to wider apertures (such as in low light or while using low-speed film).

Most SLR cameras permit upright and laterally correct viewing through use of a roof pentaprism situated in the optical path between the reflex mirror and viewfinder. Light, which comes both horizontally and vertically inverted after passing through the lens, is reflected upwards by the reflex mirror, into the pentaprism where it is reflected twice to correct the inversions caused by the lens, and align the image with the viewfinder. When the shutter is released, the mirror moves out of the light path, and the light shines directly onto the film (or in the case of a DSLR, the CCD or CMOS imaging sensor). Exceptions to the moving mirror system include the Canon Pellix and Sony SLT cameras, along with several special-purpose high-speed cameras (such as the Canon EOS-1N RS), whose mirror was a fixed beamsplitting pellicle.

Focus can be adjusted manually by the photographer or automatically by an autofocus system. The viewfinder can include a matte focusing screen located just above the mirror system to diffuse the light. This permits accurate viewing, composing and focusing, especially useful with interchangeable lenses.

Up until the 1990s, SLR was the most advanced photographic preview system available, but the recent development and refinement of digital imaging technology with an on-camera live LCD preview screen has overshadowed SLR's popularity. Nearly all inexpensive compact digital cameras now include an LCD preview screen allowing the photographer to see what the CCD is capturing. However, SLR is still popular in high-end and professional cameras because they are system cameras with interchangeable parts, allowing customization. They also have far less shutter lag, allowing photographs to be timed more precisely. Also the pixel resolution, contrast ratio, refresh rate, and color gamut of an LCD preview screen cannot compete with the clarity and shadow detail of a direct-viewed optical SLR viewfinder.

Large format SLR cameras were probably first marketed with the introduction of C.R. Smith's Monocular Duplex (U.S., 1884). SLRs for smaller exposure formats were launched in the 1920s by several camera makers. The first 35 mm SLR available to the mass market, Leica's PLOOT reflex housing along with a 200 mm f4.5 lens paired to a 35 mm rangefinder camera body, debuted in 1935. The Soviet Спорт (“Sport”), also a 24 mm by 36 mm image size, was prototyped in 1934 and went to market in 1937. K. Nüchterlein's Kine Exakta (Germany, 1936) was the first integrated 35 mm SLR to enter the market. Additional Exakta models, all with waist-level finders, were produced up to and during World War II. Another ancestor of the modern SLR camera was the Swiss-made Alpa, which was innovative, and influenced the later Japanese cameras. The first eye-level SLR viewfinder was patented in Hungary on August 23, 1943, by Jenő Dulovits, who then designed the first 35 mm camera with one, the Duflex, which used a system of mirrors to provide a laterally correct, upright image in the eye-level viewfinder. The Duflex, which went into serial production in 1948, was also the world's first SLR with an instant-return (a.k.a. autoreturn) mirror.

The first commercially produced SLR that employed a roof pentaprism was the Italian Rectaflex A.1000, shown in full working condition at a Milan fair in April 1948 and produced from September the same year. It was thus on the market one year before the East German Zeiss Ikon VEB Contax S, announced on May 20, 1949, produced from September.

The Japanese adopted and further developed the SLR. In 1952, Asahi developed the Asahiflex and in 1954, the Asahiflex IIB. In 1957, the Asahi Pentax combined the fixed pentaprism and the right-hand thumb wind lever. Nikon, Canon and Yashica introduced their first SLRs in 1959 (the F, Canonflex, and Pentamatic, respectively).

== Digital SLRs ==
Canon, Nikon and Pentax have all developed digital SLR cameras (DSLRs) using the same lens mounts as on their respective film SLR cameras. Konica Minolta did the same, and after having bought Konica Minolta's camera division in 2006 Sony continued using the Minolta AF lens mount in their DSLRs, including cameras built around a semi-transparent fixed mirror. Samsung built DSLRs based on the Pentax lens mount. Olympus, on the other hand, chose to create a new digital-only Four Thirds System SLR standard, adopted later by Panasonic and Leica.

Contax released a DSLR model, the Contax N-Digital. This model was too late and too expensive to be competitive with other camera manufacturers. The Contax N-digital was the last Contax to use that maker's lens system, and the camera, while having impressive features such as a full-frame sensor, was expensive and lacked sufficient write-speed to the memory card for it to be seriously considered by some professional photographers.

The digital single-lens reflex camera largely replaced the film SLR design in convenience, sales and popularity at the start of the 21st century, before the single-lens reflex design in general was supplanted by the mirrorless camera.

== Optical components ==
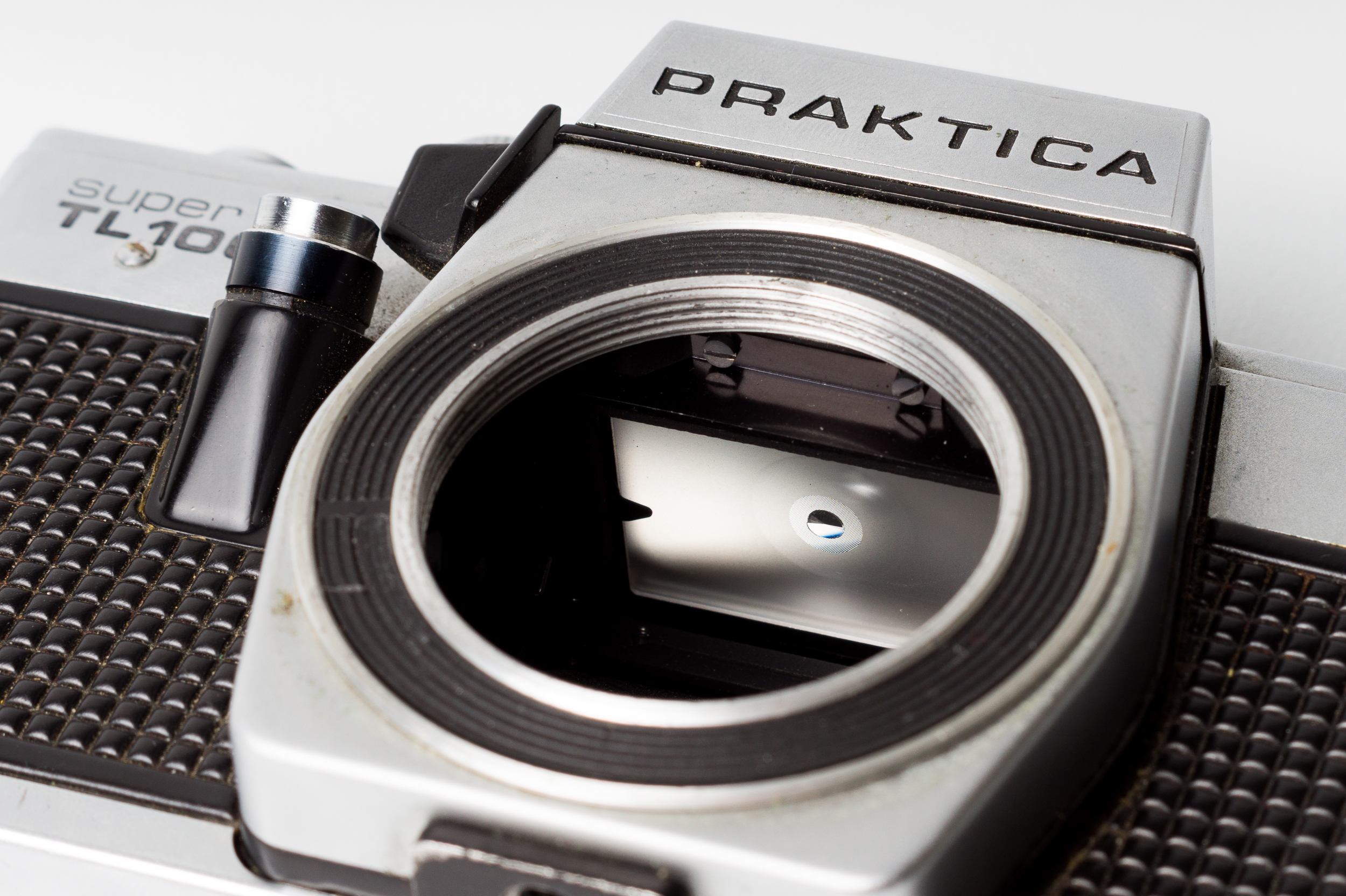
Focusing screen on Praktica Super TL1000

Cross-section view of SLR system: 1: Front-mount lens (four-element Tessar design) 2: Reflex mirror at 45-degree angle 3: Focal plane shutter 4: Film or sensor 5: Reflex mirror in the up position 6: Focusing screen 7: Optical glass pentaprism (or pentamirror) 8: Eyepiece (can have diopter correction ability)

A cross-section (or 'side-view') of the optical components of a typical SLR camera shows how the light passes through the lens assembly, is reflected by the mirror placed at a 45-degree angle, and is projected on the matte focusing screen. Via a condensing lens and internal reflections in the roof pentaprism the image appears in the eyepiece. When an image is taken, the mirror moves upwards from its resting position in the direction of the arrow, the focal plane shutter opens, and the image is projected onto the film or sensor in exactly the same manner as on the focusing screen.

This feature distinguishes SLRs from other cameras as the photographer sees the image composed exactly as it will be captured on the film or sensor.

A perspective drawing showing how a roof pentaprism corrects a laterally reversed SLR image

Most 35 mm SLRs use a roof pentaprism or penta-mirror to direct the light to the eyepiece, first used on the 1948 Duflex constructed by Jenő Dulovits and patented August 1943 (Hungary). With this camera also appeared the first instant-return mirror. The first Japanese pentaprism SLR was the 1955 Miranda T, followed by the Asahi Pentax, Minolta SR-2, Zunow, Nikon F and the Yashica Pentamatic. Some SLRs offered removable pentaprisms with optional viewfinder capabilities, such as the waist-level finder, the interchangeable sports finders used on the Canon F1 and F1n; the Nikon F, F2, F3, F4 and F5; and the Pentax LX.

Another prism design was the porro prism system used in the Olympus Pen F, the Pen FT, the Pen FV half-frame 35 mm SLR cameras. This was later used on the Olympus EVOLT E-3x0 series, the Leica Digilux 3 and the Panasonic DMC-L1.

A right-angle finder is available that slips onto the eyepiece of most SLRs and D-SLRs and allows viewing through a waist-level viewfinder. There is also a finder that provides EVF remote capability.

== Shutter mechanisms ==
Almost all contemporary SLRs use a focal-plane shutter located in front of the film plane, which prevents the light from reaching the film even if the lens is removed, except when the shutter is actually released during the exposure. There are various designs for focal plane shutters. Early focal-plane shutters designed from the 1930s onwards usually consisted of two curtains that travelled horizontally across the film gate: an opening shutter curtain followed by a closing shutter curtain. During fast shutter speeds, the focal-plane shutter would form a 'slit' whereby the second shutter curtain was closely following the first opening shutter curtain to produce a narrow, vertical opening, with the shutter slit moving horizontally. The slit would get narrower as shutter speeds were increased. Initially these shutters were made from a cloth material (which was in later years often rubberised), but some manufacturers used other materials instead. Nippon Kōgaku (now Nikon Corporation), for example, used titanium foil shutters for several of their flagship SLR cameras, including the Nikon F, F2, and F3.

Other focal-plane shutter designs, such as the Copal Square, travelled vertically — the shorter travelling distance of 24 millimetres (as opposed to 36 mm horizontally) meant that minimum exposure and flash synchronisation times could be reduced. These shutters are usually manufactured from metal, and use the same moving-slit principle as horizontally travelling shutters. They differ, though, in usually being formed of several slats or blades, rather than single curtains as with horizontal designs, as there is rarely enough room above and below the frame for a one-piece shutter. Vertical shutters became very common in the 1980s (though Konica, Mamiya, and Copal first pioneered their use in the 1950s and 1960s, and are almost exclusively used for new cameras. Nikon used Copal-made vertical plane shutters in their Nikomat/Nikkormat -range, enabling x-sync speeds from 1/30 to 1/125 while the only choice for focal plane shutters at that time was 1/60. Later, Nikon again pioneered the use of titanium for vertical shutters, using a special honeycomb pattern on the blades to reduce their weight and achieve world-record speeds in 1982 of 1/4000 second for non-sync shooting, and 1/250 with x-sync. Nowadays most such shutters are manufactured from cheaper aluminium (though some high-end cameras use materials such as carbon-fibre and Kevlar).

Another shutter system is the leaf shutter, whereby the shutter is constructed of diaphragm-like blades and can be situated either between the lens or behind the lens. If the shutter is part of a lens assembly some other mechanism is required to ensure that no light reaches the film between exposures. An example of a behind-the-lens leaf shutter is found in the 35 mm SLRs produced by Kodak, with their Retina Reflex camera line; Topcon, with their Auto 100; and Kowa with their SE-R and SET-R reflexes. A primary example of a medium-format SLR with a between-the-lens leaf shutter system would be Hasselblad, with their 500C, 500 cm, 500 EL-M (a motorized Hasselblad) and other models (producing a 6 cm square negative). Hasselblads use an auxiliary shutter blind situated behind the lens mount and the mirror system to prevent the fogging of film. Other medium-format SLRs also using leaf shutters include the now discontinued Zenza-Bronica camera system lines such as the Bronica ETRs, the ETRs'i (both producing a 6 × 4.5 cm. image), the SQ and the SQ-AI (producing a 6 × 6 cm image like the Hasselblad), and the Zenza-Bronica G system (6 × 7 cm). Certain Mamiya medium-format SLRs, discontinued camera systems such as the Kowa 6 and a few other camera models also used between-the-lens leaf shutters in their lens systems. Thus, any time a photographer purchased one of these lenses, that lens included a leaf shutter in its lens mount. Because leaf shutters synchronized electronic flash at all shutter speeds especially at fast shutter speeds of 1/500 of a second or faster, cameras using leaf shutters were more desirable to studio photographers who used sophisticated studio electronic flash systems. Some manufacturers of medium-format 120 film SLR cameras also made leaf-shutter lenses for their focal-plane-shutter models. Rollei made at least two such lenses for their Rolleiflex SL-66 medium format which was a focal-plane shutter SLR. Rollei later switched to a camera system of leaf-shutter design (e.g., the 6006 and 6008 reflexes) and their current medium-format SLRs are now all of the between-the-lens shutter design.

== Further developments ==
1. Photographic frontal glass lens; 2. Internal glass lenses; 3. Diaphragm; 4. Focal-plane shutter; 5. Photographic film; 6. Securing strap; 7. Shutter release; 8. Shutter speed selector; 9. Expose counter; 10. Viewfinder; 11. Flash socket; 12. Focus ring; 13. Pentaprism/pentamirror; 14. Reflex Mirror

Since the technology became widespread in the 1970s, SLRs have become the main photographic instrument used by dedicated amateur photographers and professionals. Some photographers of static subjects (such as architecture, landscape, and some commercial subjects), however, prefer view cameras because of the capability to control perspective. With a triple-extension bellows 4" × 5" camera such as the Linhof SuperTechnika V, the photographer can correct certain distortions such as "keystoning", where the image 'lines' converge (i.e., photographing a building by pointing a typical camera upward to include the top of the building). Perspective correction lenses are available in the 35 mm and medium formats to correct this distortion with film cameras, and it can also be corrected after the fact with photo software when using digital cameras. The photographer can also extend the bellows to its full length, tilt the front standard and perform photomacrography (commonly known as 'macro photography'), producing a sharp image with depth-of-field without stopping down the lens diaphragm.

== Film formats ==
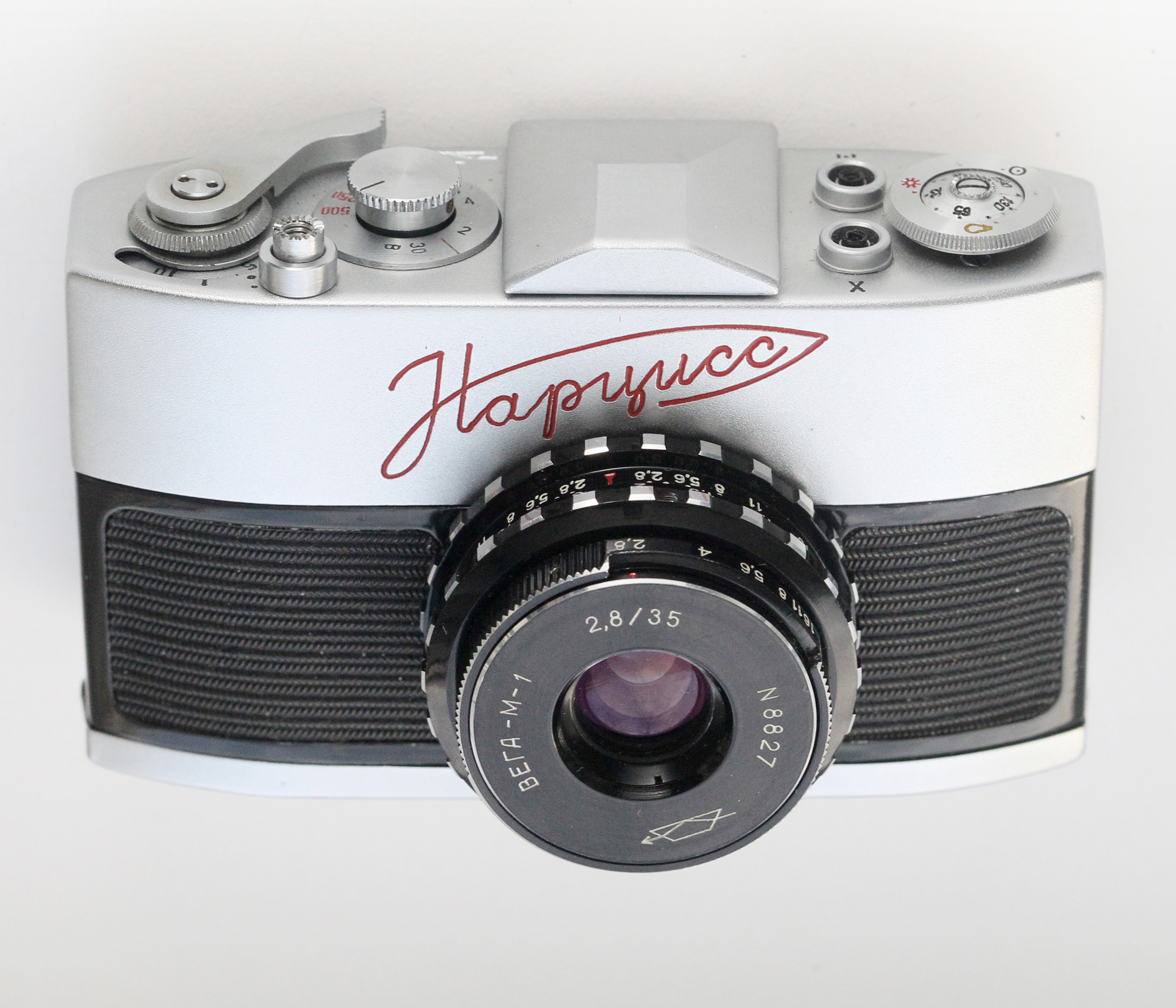
16 mm SLR Narciss camera

Early SLRs were built for large format photography, but this film format has largely lost favor among professional photographers. SLR film-based cameras have been produced for most film formats as well as for digital formats. These film-based SLRs use the 35 mm format as, this film format offers a variety of emulsions and film sensitivity speeds, usable image quality and a good market cost. 35 mm film comes in a variety of exposure lengths: 20 exposure, 24 exposure and 36 exposure rolls. Medium format SLRs provide a higher-quality image with a negative that can be more easily retouched than the smaller 35 mm negative, when this capability is required.

A small number of SLRs were built for APS such as the Canon IX series and the Nikon Pronea cameras. SLRs were also introduced for film formats as small as Kodak's 110, such as the Pentax Auto 110, which had interchangeable lenses.

The Narciss camera is an all-metal 16 mm subminiature single lens reflex camera made by Russian optic firm Krasnogorsky Mekhanichesky Zavod (KMZ) Narciss (Soviet Union; Нарцисс) between 1961 and 1965.

== Common features ==
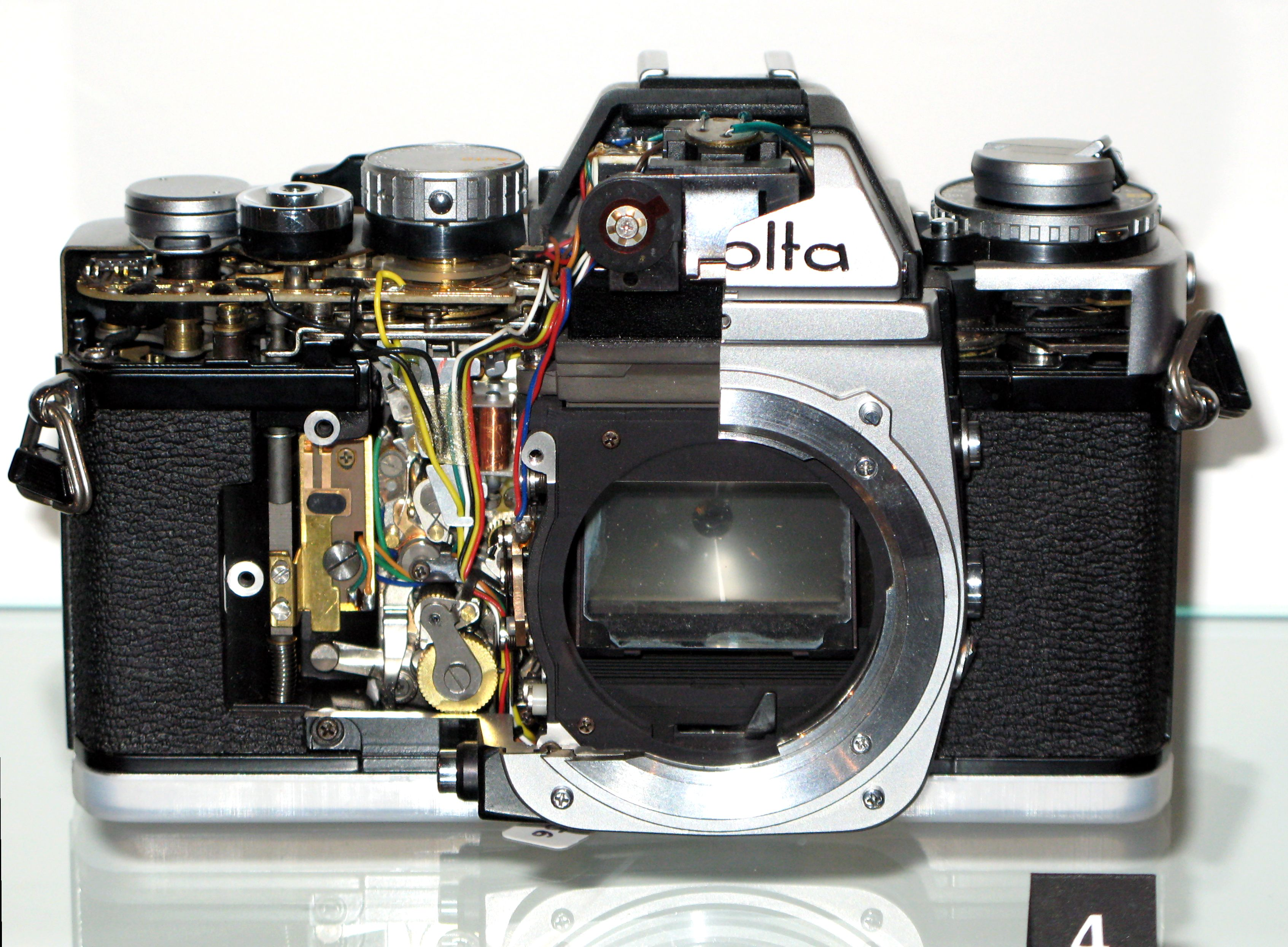
Cut-away of a Minolta XE film-based SLR

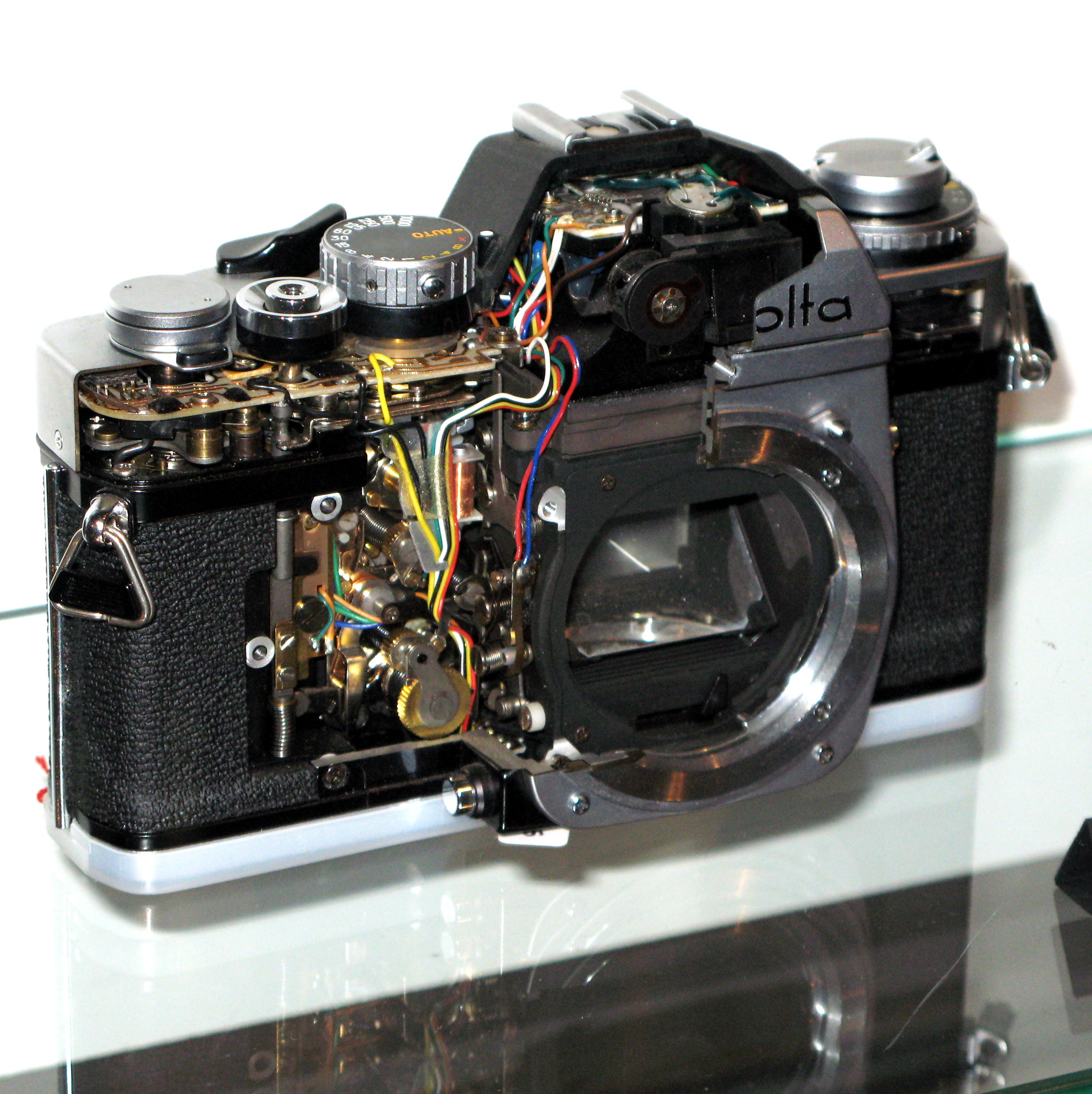

Other features found on many SLR cameras include through-the-lens (TTL) metering and sophisticated flash control referred to as "dedicated electronic flash". In a dedicated system, once the dedicated electronic flash is inserted into the camera's hot shoe and turned on, there is then communication between camera and flash. The camera's synchronization speed is set, along with the aperture. Many camera models measure the light that reflects off of the film plane, which controls the flash duration of the electronic flash. This is denoted TTL flash metering.

Some electronic flash units can send out several short bursts of light to aid the autofocus system or for wireless communication with off-camera flash units. A pre-flash is often used to determine the amount of light that is reflected from the subject, which sets the duration of the main flash at time of exposure. Some cameras also employ automatic fill-flash, where the flash light and the available light are balanced. While these capabilities are not unique to the SLR, manufacturers included them early on in the top models, whereas the best rangefinder cameras adopted such features later.

== Design considerations ==
Many of the advantages of SLR cameras derive from viewing and focusing the image through the attached lens. Most other types of cameras do not have this function; subjects are seen through a viewfinder that is near the lens, making the photographer's view different from that of the lens. SLR cameras provide photographers with precision; they provide a viewing image that will be exposed onto the negative exactly as it is seen through the lens. There is no parallax error, and exact focus can be confirmed by eye—especially in macro photography and when photographing using long focus lenses. The depth of field may be seen by stopping down to the attached lens aperture, which is possible on most SLR cameras except for the least expensive models. Because of the SLR's versatility, most manufacturers have a vast range of lenses and accessories available for them.

Compared to most fixed-lens compact cameras, the most commonly used and inexpensive SLR lenses offer a wider aperture range and larger maximum aperture (typically f/1.4 to f/1.8 for a 50 mm lens). This allows photographs to be taken in lower light conditions without flash, and allows a narrower depth of field, which is useful for blurring the background behind the subject, making the subject more prominent. "Fast" lenses are commonly used in theater photography, portrait photography, surveillance photography, and all other photography requiring a large maximum aperture.

The variety of lenses also allows for the camera to be used and adapted in many different situations. This provides the photographer with considerably more control (i.e., how the image is viewed and framed) than would be the case with a view camera. In addition, some SLR lenses are manufactured with extremely long focal lengths, allowing a photographer to be a considerable distance away from the subject and yet still expose a sharp, focused image. This is particularly useful if the subject includes dangerous animals (e.g., wildlife); the subject prefers anonymity to being photographed; or else, the photographer's presence is unwanted (e.g., celebrity photography or surveillance photography). Practically all SLR and DSLR camera bodies can also be attached to telescopes and microscopes via an adapter tube to further enhance their imaging capabilities.

During an exposure, the viewfinder is blocked.

In most cases, single-lens reflex cameras cannot be made as small or as light as other camera designs—such as rangefinder cameras, autofocus compact cameras and digital cameras with electronic viewfinders (EVF)—owing to the mirror box and pentaprism/pentamirror. The mirror box also prevents lenses with deeply recessed rear elements from being mounted close to the film or sensor unless the camera has a mirror lockup feature; this means that simple designs for wide angle lenses cannot be used. Instead, larger and more complex retrofocus designs are required.

The SLR mirror 'blacks-out' the viewfinder image during the exposure. In addition, the movement of the reflex mirror takes time, limiting the maximum shooting speed. The mirror system can also cause noise and vibration. Partially reflective (pellicle) fixed mirrors avoid these problems and have been used in a very few designs including the Canon Pellix and the Canon EOS-1N RS, but these designs introduce their own problems. These pellicle mirrors reduce the amount of light travelling to the film plane or sensor and also can distort the light passing through them, resulting in a less-sharp image. To avoid the noise and vibration, many professional cameras offer a mirror lock-up feature, however, this feature totally disables the SLR's automatic focusing ability. Electronic viewfinders have the potential to give the 'viewing-experience' of a DSLR (through-the-lens viewing) without many of the disadvantages. More recently, Sony have resurrected the pellicle mirror concept in their "single-lens translucent" (SLT) range of cameras.

SLRs vary widely in their construction and typically have bodies made of plastic or magnesium. Most manufacturers do not cite durability specifications, but some report shutter life expectancies for professional models. For instance, the Canon EOS 1Ds MkII is rated for 200,000 shutter cycles and the Nikon D3 is rated for 300,000 with its exotic carbon fiber/kevlar shutter. Because many SLRs have interchangeable lenses, there is a tendency for dust, sand and dirt to get into the main body of the camera through the mirror box when the lens is removed, thus dirtying or even jamming the mirror movement mechanism or the shutter curtain mechanism itself. In addition, these particles can also jam or otherwise hinder the focusing feature of a lens if they enter into the focusing helicoid. The problem of sensor cleaning has been somewhat reduced in DSLRs as some cameras have a built-in sensor cleaning unit.

The price of SLRs in general also tends to be somewhat higher than that of other types of cameras, owing to their internal complexity. This is compounded by the expense of additional components, such as flashes or lenses. The initial investment in equipment can be prohibitive enough to keep some casual photographers away from SLRs, although the market for used SLRs has become larger particularly as photographers migrate to digital systems.

The SLR mirror 'blacks-out' the viewfinder image during the exposure on this film SLR, the Pentax K1000 without a lens.

== Future ==
The digital single-lens reflex camera has largely replaced the film SLR for its convenience, sales, and popularity at the start of the 21st century. These cameras were the marketing favorite among advanced amateur and professional photographers through the first two decades of the 2000s. Around 2010, the mirrorless technology utilized in point and shoot cameras made the way to the interchangeable lens cameras and slowly replaced DSLR technology.

As of 2022, all the major camera brands (except Pentax) ceased development and production of DSLRs and moved on to mirrorless systems. These systems offer multiple advantages to the photographer with regards to autofocus systems as well as the ability to update the lens technologies due to the reduced distance between the back of the lens and the sensor resulting from the removal of the mirror.

Film-based SLRs continue to be used by a dedicated market of hobbyists, fine-art photographers, and students of analogue photography.

== See also ==
- Asahi Pentax
- Fujifilm
- Lenses for SLR and DSLR cameras
- Scheimpflug principle
- Zeiss Ikon
