= Olympus E-300 =

Digital camera model

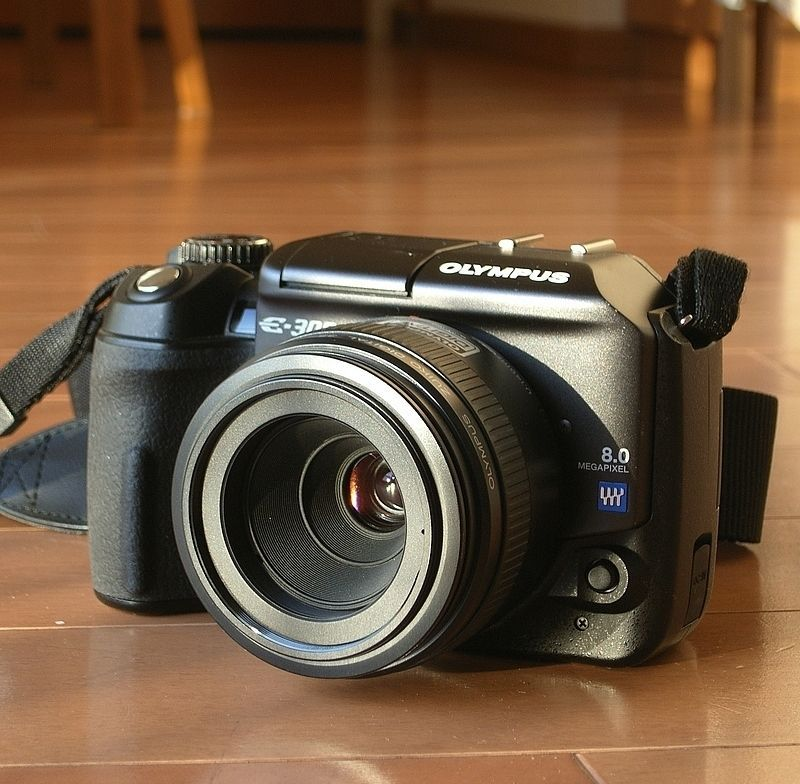

Overview
- Maker: Olympus Corporation
- Type: Digital single-lens reflex

Lens
- Lens: Interchangeable (Four Thirds mount); uses Four Thirds lenses from various makers, ranges from Olympus 8mm f/3.5 fisheye to Sigma 50-500mm f/4-6.3

Sensor/medium
- Sensor: Kodak KAF-8300CE Four Thirds System FFT-CCD
- Maximum resolution: 3,264 × 2,448 (8 million)
- Film speed: 100 to 1600
- Storage media: CompactFlash (Type I or Type II)

Focusing
- Focus modes: Auto, Manual, Auto+Manual, Continuous
- Focus areas: 3 Points

Exposure/metering
- Exposure modes: Manual, Shutter Priority, Aperture Priority, Program
- Exposure metering: ESP, Center-Weighted, Spot
- Metering modes: ESP, Center-Weighted, Spot

Flash
- Flash: Built In and Hot Shoe

Shutter
- Shutter: Unrated
- Shutter speed range: 1/4000 to 30 seconds, Bulb
- Continuous shooting: 2.5 frame/s

Viewfinder
- Viewfinder: Optical TTL with Porro mirror

Image processing
- White balance: 2000K to 10000K
- WB bracketing: Yes, Adjustable to increments of 2 steps, 3 steps, or 6 steps.

General
- LCD screen: 1.8"
- Battery: Li-ion 7.2v Rechargeable
- Weight: 624 g (22 oz)

The Olympus E-300 (Olympus Evolt E-300 in North America) is an 8-megapixel digital SLR manufactured by Olympus of Japan and based on the Four Thirds System. Announced at photokina 2004, it became available at the end of 2004. It was the second camera (after the Olympus E-1) to use the Four Thirds System, and the first intended for the consumer market.

== Features ==
The camera's appearance was unique, as it lacked the ubiquitous SLR pentaprism "hump". Instead, a Porro prism system was used; it fitted sideways within the camera, with a sideways-swinging mirror, and located the viewfinder eyepiece to the left (seen from behind) relative to the lens centerline. The body was largely of ABS plastic over a metal frame; the lens mount was metal, and there was a metal covered area on the left top of the camera. This area also contained the onboard flash, which popped up and forward at the touch of a button. The onboard flash popup mechanism is manual. In low light scenarios the flash will not pop up automatically but the photographer must press the button and pop it up before taking the photo.

The E-300 uses Olympus' patented Supersonic Wave Filter dust reduction system to shake dust from the sensor during startup and when requested by the user; this largely eliminates the problem of dust accumulation on the surface of the image sensor.

The E-300 was replaced by the Olympus E-330, a similar model with live preview, in January 2006.

== See also ==
- Commons:category:Olympus E-300 — Pictures

	2003	2004	2005	2006	2007	2008	2009	2010	2011	2012	2013
Flagship		E-1				E-3			E-5		
High-end							E-30				
Midrange							E-620				
Midrange								E-600			
Midrange				E-500	E-510		E-520				
Entry-level			E-300	E-330			E-450				
Entry-level				E-400	E-410		E-420				
