= Olympus E-330 =

Digital camera model

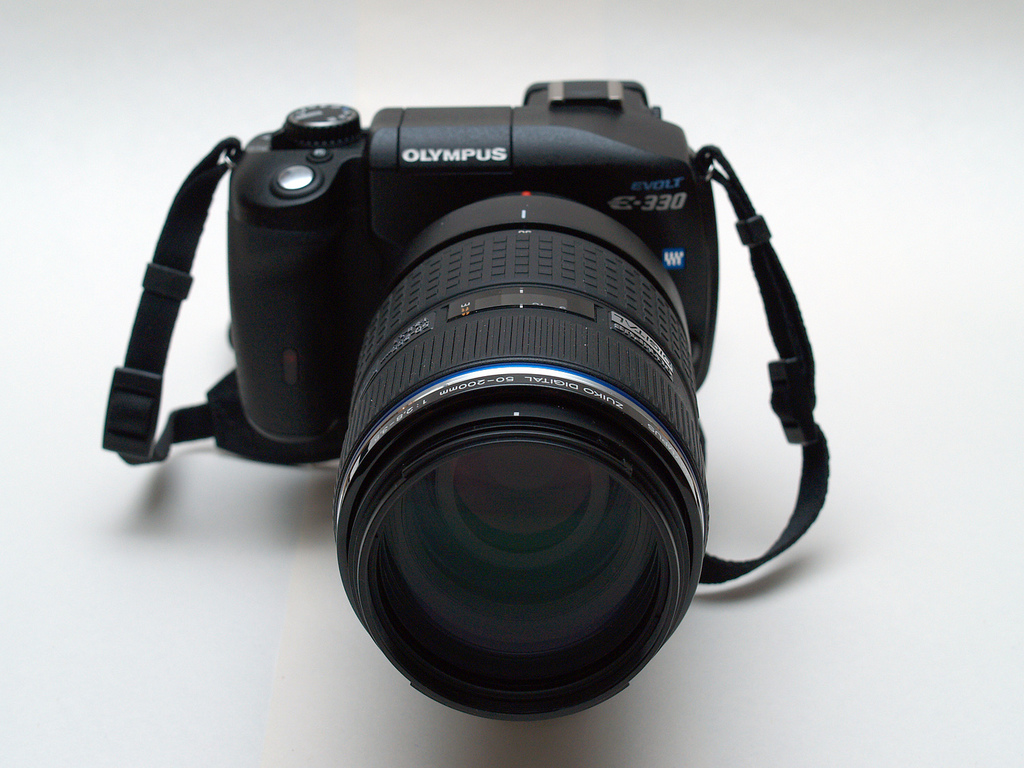

Overview
- Maker: Olympus Corporation
- Type: Digital single-lens reflex

Lens
- Lens: Interchangeable Four Thirds mount

Sensor/medium
- Sensor: 17.3 x 13.0 mm Four Thirds System Live MOS sensor 2x FOV crop
- Maximum resolution: 3136 x 2352 (7.4 effective Megapixels)
- Film speed: ISO 100 to 400 in 1/3, or 1.0 EV steps Limiter for 800 or less / expandable 1600
- Storage media: CompactFlash Type I/II, Microdrive, xD-Picture Card

Focusing
- Focus modes: Single AF ( S-AF ) Continuous AF ( C-AF ) Manual Focus ( MF ) S-AF + MF; C-AF + MF
- Focus areas: 3-point TTL Phase Difference Detection System
- Focus bracketing: 5/7 frames ( 2-step focusing available in each mode )

Exposure/metering
- Exposure modes: Program automatic Aperture automatic Shutter automatic Manual setting Scene programme Scene select
- Exposure metering: TTL open-aperture metering system
- Metering modes: Digital ESP metering (49-point multi pattern); Centre weighted Spot (approx. 2%); Spot with Highlight control Spot with Shadow control

Flash
- Flash: Built in Pop-up, Guide number 13m at ISO 100, hotshoe
- Flash bracketing: 3 frames in 1/3, 1/2, 2/3, or 1EV steps

Shutter
- Shutter: Computerised focal-plane shutter
- Shutter speed range: 1/4000 sec - 60 sec Bulb mode (up to approx. 8 minutes); 1/180s X sync
- Continuous shooting: 3 frame/s up to 4 RAW/TIFF images or JPEG (depending on memory card size, battery power, picture size, and compression)

Viewfinder
- Viewfinder: Optical 0.93x Porro prism

Image processing
- White balance: 7 settings ( 3000K - 7500K ) +/-7 steps in each R-B/G-M axis
- WB bracketing: 3 frames. 2/4/6 steps selectable in each R-B/G-M axis

General
- LCD screen: 2.5" (63.5 mm) TFT LCD, 215,000 pixels
- Battery: BLM-1 Li-ion battery
- Weight: Approx. 550g ( body only)

The Olympus E-330 is a DSLR launched on 30 January 2006, using the Four Thirds System lens mount standard. Its main feature is its live image preview functionality, permitting an image to be previewed on the LCD screen. While live image preview is not new in compact digital cameras, the E-330 is significant because it was the first digital SLR to offer this feature. With the ability to digitally zoom in 10× before taking a picture, it is very well suited for exact manual focussing, for example in macro photography.

Unlike many other digital SLRs, the E-330 used a second sensor in the viewfinder chamber which was fed by splitting 20% of the light from the viewfinder. The advantage of this implementation is that the camera's autofocus and exposure systems are fully functional and there is no shutter lag. This mode is known as Live Preview A. The E-330 also offers a liveview mode using the main sensor known as Live Preview B or Macro Live Preview; however on initial release, autofocus in this mode was disabled, but firmware update 1.2 released on 22 June 2006 allowed autofocus to take place on pressing the AEL/AFL button, dropping the mirror briefly to allow AF lock to be acquired. There is additional shutter lag due to the extra close/open at the beginning and the end of the exposure cycle. Sony have adopted a similar liveview implementation in their digital SLRs which also place a second sensor in the viewfinder chamber although a moving mirror to allow all light to go to this sensor avoids the dark viewfinder problem the e-330 suffered from.

The E-330 also offers a 7.5-megapixel image sensor, and has an articulated LCD monitor which tilts up and down for waist-level and over-the-head photography. It was the first interchangeable lens DSLR to offer this feature.

The E-330 uses Olympus' patented Supersonic Wave Filter dust reduction system to shake dust from the sensor during startup and when requested by the user; this largely eliminates the problem of dust accumulation on the surface of the image sensor.

The camera offers the following "scene" modes: Portrait, Landscape, Landscape + Portrait, Night Scene, Night + Portrait, Children, Sport, High Key, Low Key, D Image Stabilization, Macro, Nature Macro, Candle, Sunset, Fireworks, Documents, Panorama, Beach & Snow, Underwater Wide, Underwater Macro.

The Panasonic Lumix DMC-L1 and the Leica Digilux 3 are both built using the same basic inner mechanism from the Olympus E-330, and thus also share the live preview function. Unlike the E-330 however, neither the L1 or Digilux 3 incorporated the second sensor in the viewfinder chamber and could only produce the liveview output from the main sensor. They still suffered from the same darker viewfinder as they shared the same mirror to divert 20% of the light for the non-existent secondary sensor. However, they were able to use AF on the main sensor by briefly dropping the mirror from their launch, and offered live histogram, live white balance preview and live metering during main sensor Live Preview, which the E-330 did not. On the other hand, all three manufacturers suggested that the eyepiece should be blocked during main-sensor live preview to prevent light ingress affecting the process, but only the E-330 included a built-in eyepiece shutter, operated by a lever next to the eyepiece.

	2003	2004	2005	2006	2007	2008	2009	2010	2011	2012	2013
Flagship		E-1				E-3			E-5		
High-end							E-30				
Midrange							E-620				
Midrange								E-600			
Midrange				E-500	E-510		E-520				
Entry-level			E-300	E-330			E-450				
Entry-level				E-400	E-410		E-420				
