= Leica Digilux 3 =

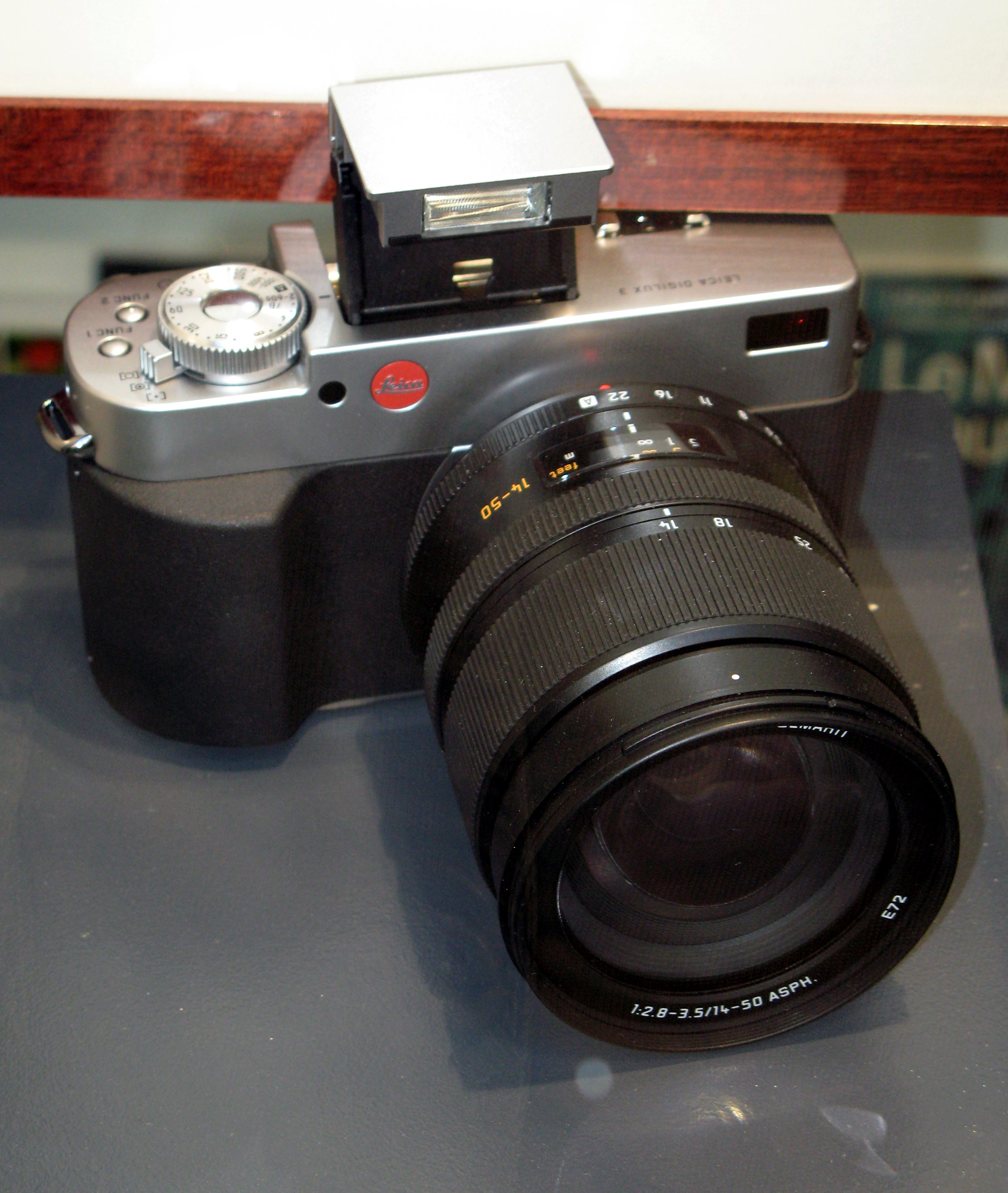

Overview
- Maker: Leica Camera
- Type: Digital single-lens reflex

Lens
- Lens: Interchangeable Four Thirds mount

Sensor/medium
- Sensor: 17.3 × 13.0 mm Four Thirds System RGB Live MOS sensor 2× FOV crop
- Maximum resolution: 3136 × 2352 (7.4 effective Megapixels)
- Film speed: 100–1600
- Storage media: Secure Digital, SDHC, MultiMediaCard

Focusing
- Focus modes: AFS / AFC / MF
- Focus areas: 3-point TTL Phase Difference Detection System

Exposure/metering
- Exposure modes: Program automatic Aperture automatic Shutter automatic Manual setting
- Exposure metering: TTL
- Metering modes: Intelligent Multiple / Center Weighted / Spot; 49 zone metering (use viewfinder); 25 zones metering (EVF)

Flash
- Flash: Built in Pop-up, Guide number 10m at ISO 100, SCA 3202 hotshoe

Shutter
- Shutter: Focal-plane shutter
- Shutter speed range: 1/4000–60 sec Bulb mode (up to approx. 8 minutes); 1/160s X sync
- Continuous shooting: 2 or 3 frame/s up to 6 RAW images or ∞ JPEG (depending on memory card size, battery power, picture size, and compression)

Viewfinder
- Viewfinder: Optical 0.93× Porro prism

Image processing
- White balance: auto, daylight, cloudy skies, shadow, halogen, flash, manual 1+2 & color temperature setting (2500 K to 10000 K in 31 steps) fine tuning: blue/amber bias; magenta/green bias

General
- LCD screen: 2.5" (63.5 mm) TFT LCD, 207,000 pixels
- Battery: Li-ion battery pack (7.2 V, 1,500 mAh)
- Weight: approx. 530 g (18.7 oz) (housing)

The Digilux 3 is a digital single-lens reflex camera introduced by Leica on 14 September 2006. The Digilux 3 and the Panasonic Lumix DMC-L1 are similar specification cameras, using the Four Thirds standard lens mount and featuring a 7.5 Megapixels live view N-MOS sensor, but the Digilux 3 has modified firmware including DNG output. Both the Panasonic and Digilux 3 cameras come standard with the same interchangeable Leica Vario-Elmarit 14–50 mm f/2.8–3.5 optically image-stabilized zoom lens. The Leica D system includes also the Leica Summilux 25 mm f/1.4 lens.

The two cameras share several unique features among dSLRs. One is the presence of film-camera type controls for optional control of both aperture and shutter speed. Reviews have noted the intuitive "feel" of the cameras.

Another is the built-in dual-position flash. With an initial actuation of the flash button, the flash pops up to a bounce-flash position, giving a more diffuse flash that is preferred by some photographers, especially for portrait photos. A second actuation of the button raises the flash to a forward-facing position for direct flash.

Some of the build features are inherited from the Olympus E-330, such as the eyepiece. Spare parts, such as the EP-7 eyecup from Olympus, can be used on the Digilux 3.

The camera also includes Adobe Photoshop Elements 4.0 and QuickTime movie player. Only 13,300 of these cameras were made, making it somewhat rare. (W x H x D without lens) - 145.8 x 86.9 x 80 mm Weight (camera body) - approx. 530 g. Designed by Achim Heine, Berlin (Leica), Electronics by Matsushita/Olympus

== See also ==
- Leica Digilux 1
- Leica Digilux 2
- Panasonic
  - Lumix
