= Panasonic Lumix DMC-L1 =

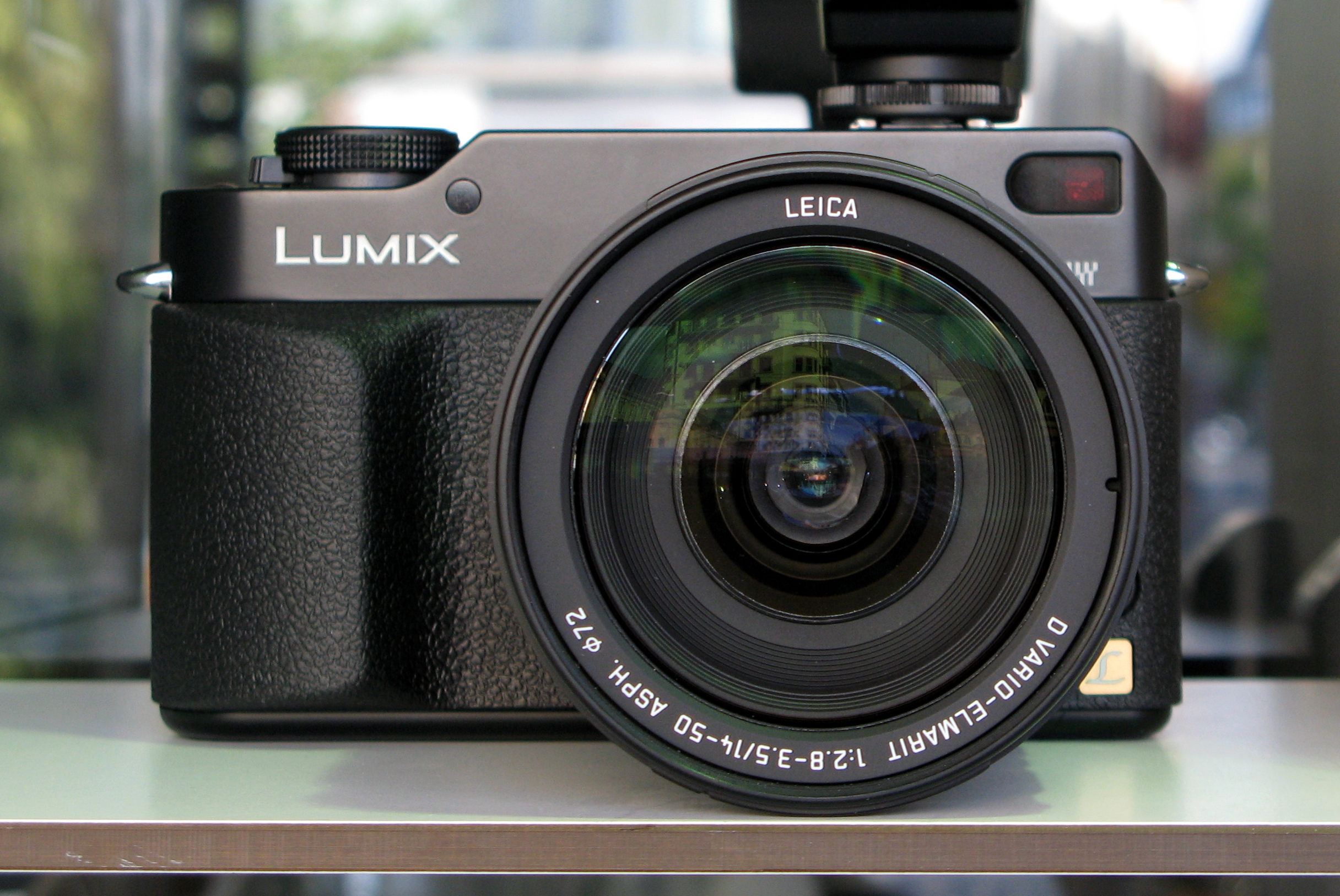

Overview
- Maker: Panasonic Holdings Corporation
- Type: Digital single-lens reflex

Lens
- Lens: Four Thirds mount

Sensor/medium
- Sensor: 17.3 × 13.0 mm Four Thirds System RGB Live MOS sensor 2× FOV crop
- Maximum resolution: 3136 × 2352 (7.4 effective Megapixels)
- Film speed: 100–1600
- Storage media: Secure Digital, SDHC, MultiMediaCard

Focusing
- Focus modes: AFS / AFC / MF
- Focus areas: 3-point TTL Phase Difference Detection System

Exposure/metering
- Exposure modes: Program automatic Aperture automatic Shutter automatic Manual setting
- Exposure metering: TTL
- Metering modes: Intelligent Multiple / Center Weighted / Spot; 49 zone metering (use viewfinder); 256 zones metering (EVF)

Flash
- Flash: Built in Pop-up, Guide number 10m at ISO 100, hotshoe

Shutter
- Shutter: Focal-plane shutter
- Shutter speed range: 1/4000 – 60 sec Bulb mode (up to approx. 8 minutes); 1/160s X sync
- Continuous shooting: 2 or 3 frame/s up to 6 RAW images or ∞ JPEG (depending on memory card size, battery power, picture size, and compression)

Viewfinder
- Viewfinder: Optical 0.93× Porro prism

Image processing
- White balance: auto, daylight, cloudy skies, shadow, halogen, flash, manual 1+2 & color temperature setting (2500 K to 10000 K in 31 steps) fine tuning: blue/amber bias; magenta/green bias

General
- LCD screen: 2.5" (63.5 mm) TFT LCD, 207,000 pixels
- Battery: Li-ion battery pack (7.2 V, 1,500 mAh)
- Weight: approx. 530 g (18.7 oz)
- Made in: Japan

The Lumix DMC-L1 is Panasonic's first DSLR camera, and was announced in February 2006. This camera adheres to the Four Thirds System lens mount standard, making it the first non-Olympus Four Thirds camera, and thus confirming that the Four Thirds System is a semi-open standard such that compatible camera bodies can be built by different companies.

The Lumix DMC-L1, together with the Olympus E-330 (with which it shares some technology), were the first ILCs that featured live view, a capability later copied by other manufacturers. Live view makes it possible to preview the image on the LCD screen while composing the picture, and is particularly useful for high- and low-angled shots when it is uncomfortable or not feasible for the user to bring the eye to the viewfinder.

The camera was introduced with a new Leica D Vario-Elmarit 14–50mm f/2.8–3.5 lens (a 28-100mm 35mm equivalent), the first Leica lens for the Four Thirds System, and the first Four Thirds lens with image stabilization. The image stabilization can allow 2–3 stops lower shutter speed, and the quality of the lens is such that its value may exceed that of the camera body, and helps explain the relatively high combined introductory price of US $2000. Panasonic introduced two additional lenses under the Leica brand name for the camera and Four Thirds System, being a 25mm f1.4 Summilux (50mm 35mm equivalent) without image stabilization) and an extended version of the kit lens out to 150mm (28-300mm 35mm equivalent) with image stabilization.

The Lumix DMC-L1 has an overall shape and viewfinder location reminiscent of a rangefinder camera rather than an SLR, and features a shutter speed dial on the body and an aperture ring on each lens, also similar to pre-digital 35mm film rangefinders and SLRs. Another design feature is the built-in flash which has a two-position operation: the first push of the open button puts the flash pointing 45 degrees up to provide bounce flash, a feature that was mentioned in The New York Times in an article on brilliant ideas, and a second push of the button has the flash point directly away from the camera for full flash effect.

The Leica Digilux 3, was presented in September 2006 and is based upon the same design as the Lumix DMC-L1.

The Lumix DMC-L1 was succeeded by the Lumix DMC-L10, announced in August, 2007.

Panasonic no longer supports the Lumix DMC-L1 and has abandoned the standard Four-Thirds system in favor of a Micro Four-Thirds system that, with an available adapter, can still accommodate the three Four-Thirds Leica lenses developed for the Lumix DMC-L1 and the Leica Digilux 3. A fairly wide selection of Olympus standard Four-Thirds Zuiko lenses remains available, however.
