= Live preview =

Function on a camera to use the screen as a viewfinder

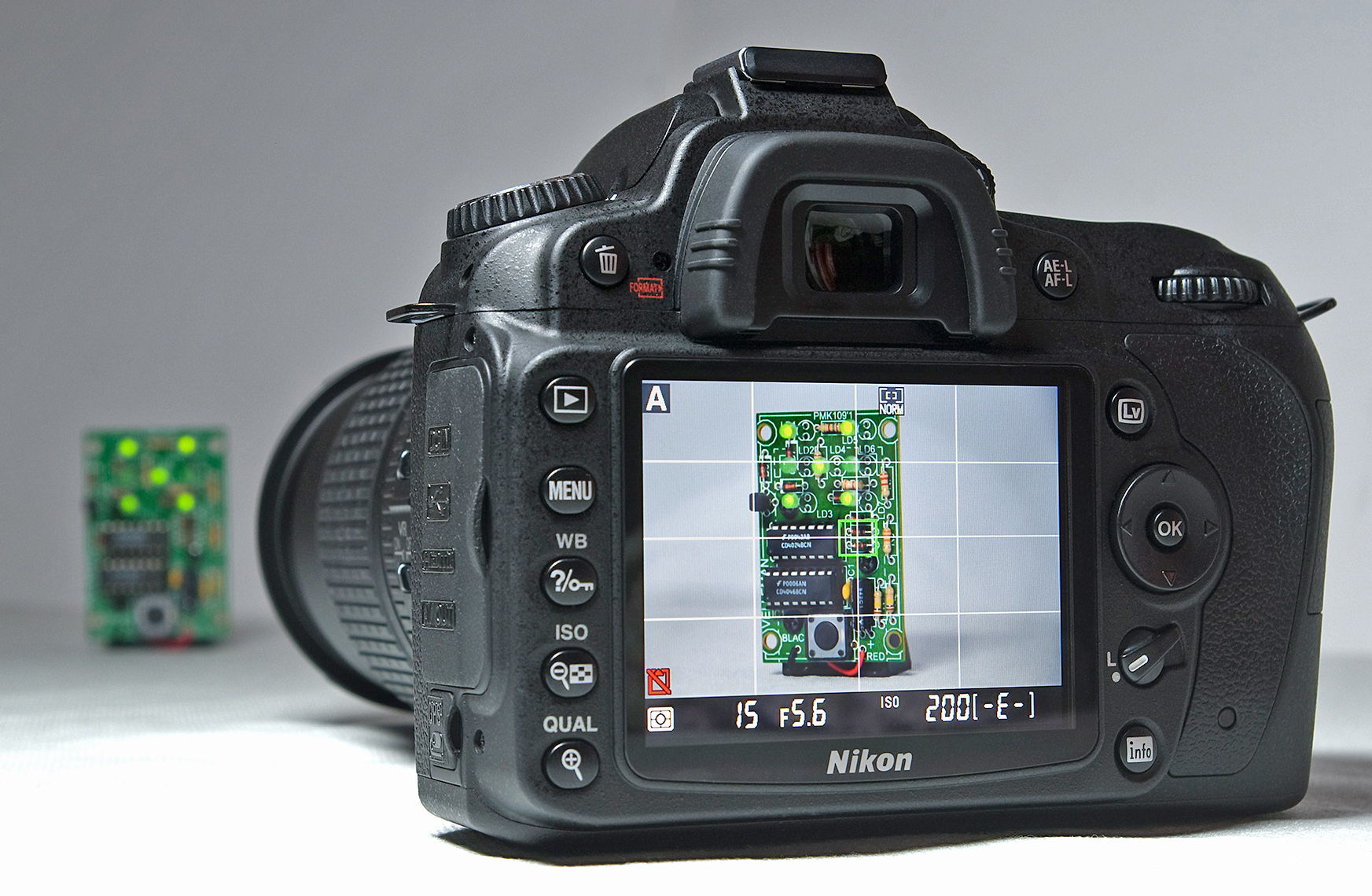
A Nikon D90 in live view framing mode

Live preview is a feature that allows a digital camera's display screen to be used as a viewfinder. This provides a means of previewing framing and other exposure before taking the photograph. In most such cameras, the preview is generated by means of continuously and directly projecting the image formed by the lens onto the main image sensor. This in turn feeds the electronic screen with the live preview image. The electronic screen can be either a liquid crystal display (LCD) or an electronic viewfinder (EVF).

== Background ==
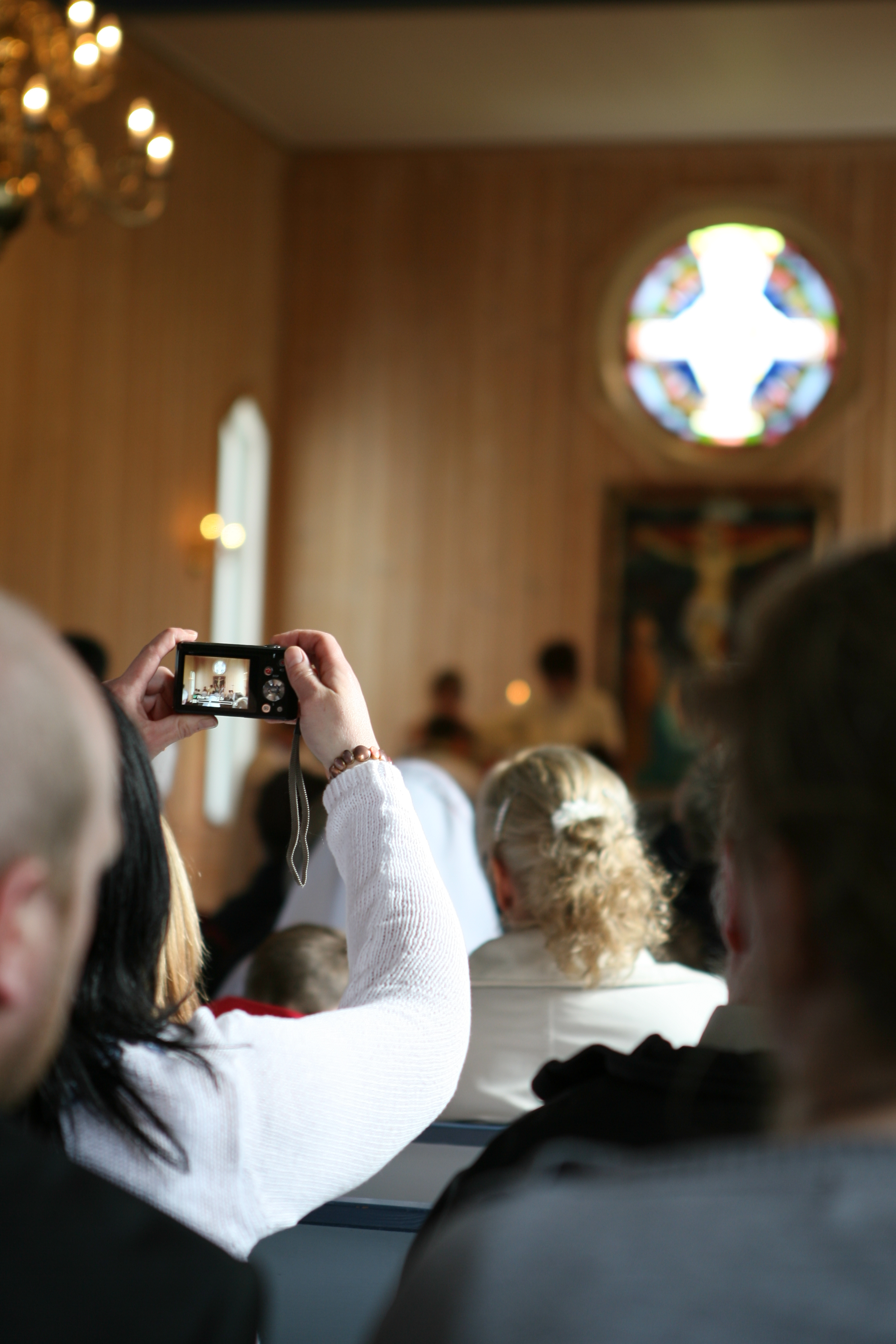
Live preview on LCD

The concept for cameras with live preview largely derives from electronic (video) TV cameras. Until 1995 most digital cameras did not have live preview, and it was more than ten years after this that the higher end digital single-lens reflex cameras (DSLR) adopted this feature, as it is fundamentally incompatible with the swinging-mirror single-lens reflex mechanism.

The first digital still camera with an LCD for autogain framing live preview was the Casio QV-10 in 1995.

The first prosumer camera to use live view for both exposure simulation live preview ES-LV control and live preview framing was the fixed-lens Canon PowerShot G1 from 2000 (possibly the first was Canon Powershot Pro70 in 1998), although this was still in the line of compact cameras.

The first DSLR to use live view for framing preview only, like early other live view but non-mirrored digicams, was the fixed-lens Olympus E-10 from 2000. The first interchangeable-lens DSLR to use a live preview for framing was the Fujifilm FinePix S3 Pro, which was launched in October 2004. Its "Live Image" mode could display a live, black-and-white framing preview of the subject that could be magnified for manual focusing purposes, although the preview was limited to a duration of thirty seconds.

The first interchangeable-lens DSLR following ES-LV capabilities of Canon's Powershot G1 (maybe, Canon Powershot Pro70) was in early 2005 with the Canon EOS 20Da, a special version of the Canon EOS 20D with exposure simulation live view modifications for astrophotography, which included a similar focus preview feature, plus first ever for any DSLR the new exposure simulation live view allowed capture of star exposures to selectable brightness 'effects' (Canon ExpSim LV). The first general-use interchangeable-lens DSLRs with live view for both exposure simulated live preview (ExpSim LV) and framing livepreview were the Canon 20Da of 2005, followed by Canon EOS 1Ds Mark III and Canon EOS 40D of 2007. The first general-use interchangeable-lens DSLR with live view for framing preview only like most fixed lens digicams was the Olympus E-330 of 2006.

== Types ==
There are two distinct modes of live-preview, with only a few manufacturers offering both in their digital cameras.

The first is a more rudimentary type of live preview that displays the overall framing on an electronic display and allows a preview of what the camera's sensor will detect before the photograph is taken. This can be particularly helpful when the lighting conditions are too dark for an optical viewfinder. This type of live preview is the autogain/framing live view type (or framing priority display). This requires traditional means of exposure determination requiring metering of the light coming through the lens, and interpreting the light intensity indication on an automatic light meter, and then adjusting exposure parameters for a desired effect.

The second is a more sophisticated type of live preview that displays the exact exposure 'look' on an electronic display and allows the photographer to alter the exposure look via adjustments to parameters such as shutter speed, film speed or ISO, and aperture, before the photograph is taken. This second type of live preview is the exposure simulation live preview type (or exposure priority display). This type of live preview eliminates reliance on traditional light metering usage.

Many modern bridge and compact cameras with movie mode have only an automatic exposure and limited exposure compensation control, and live view that is primarily for framing only.

== Live preview only cameras ==
Live-preview-only cameras, that is cameras without an optical viewfinder, include four different categories: compact digital cameras, bridge digital cameras, and the newer mirrorless interchangeable lens cameras and Sony SLT cameras.

Bridge cameras in general are higher-end, that is they contain more advanced features, better build quality, larger size, and are more expensive than compacts, but retain a small digital sensor. Mirrorless cameras feature a larger sensor and interchangeable lenses, like DSLRs, but sacrifice the SLR mirror mechanism and viewfinder to save size and cost, and hence only offer live preview.

The SLT, developed by Sony, uses a mirror similar to that found in a DSLR. However, unlike the moving and fully reflective mirror of DSLRs, the SLT mirror is fixed and semi-reflective. New Zealand-based British photographer Gordon Laing describes the technology:

"[A] fixed semi-reflective mirror allows around 70% of the light to pass through to the sensor for full-time live view composition, but reflects the remaining 30% or so to the phase change AF system, allowing quick and continuous autofocusing in Live View and movie modes. 30% is however too little for a traditional optical viewfinder, so Sony doesn't bother, instead using the main sensor to deliver a live image to an electronic viewfinder in addition to the main rear screen for composition."

The same technology was used by Olympus prior to Sony in the Olympus E-10.

== Digital SLRs ==
Early examples of Exposure Simulation Live View (ES-LV) in advanced prosumer digicams with Full Manual / Manual ISO, such as Canon's PowerShot Pro70 (1998), Powershot G1 (2000) and Powershot Pro90 IS (2001), all feature an optical viewfinder or optical tunnel and display the preview image on their vari-angle swivel screen LCD. This gives a live real-time WYSIWYG (what you see is what you get) exposure simulation preview in Full Manual / Manual ISO mode, and Auto-Exposure (AE) / Manual ISO modes: P (Program), TV (Time Value: shutter speed priority), and Av (Aperture Value). If Auto ISO is used, Autogain (Auto-EV0) framing/focus live view suspends Exposure Simulation live view.

This advanced exposure simulation live (pre-)view ES-LV on Canon's prosumer Powershots was absent on all interchangeable-lens DSLRs till Canon introduced a first ES-LV for an interchangeable-lens DSLR (they dubbed it: "ExpSim LV" version) in its EOS 20Da, to preview star exposures live, which was similar to ES-LV found in its advanced prosumer Powershot digicams. Later, Canon extended its more sophisticated DSLR ExpSim LV all shooting light conditions like its Powershot digicams. The most significant advances and difference in DSLR version of ES-LV was simulating exposure changes effects with chosen aperture changes without stopping down the aperture. The ES-LV of its Powershot digicams always kept its apertures stopped down, so no 'aperture exposure simulation' was needed, and briefly opened aperture to assess focus with shutter button partially depressed before a shot is taken. The ExpSim LV of its EOS lens DSLRs could achieve the same 'exposure simulation' effect in both aperture stop-down mode and aperture wide open of its EOS lenses, even if the aperture selection was narrower than widest diameter (wide open).

In Autogain framing live view, such as in AE modes with Auto ISO in effect, using the dof button can take on two different effects: autogain during aperture stopped down (easy to see dof preview), and autogain-locked or suspended during aperture stopped down (difficult to see dof, just like looking with a non-live view DSLR of optical viewfinder (OVF) preview through-the-lens (TTL).

For ES-LV digicam users and ExpSim LV DSLR users, this advanced method of "Adjustable/Selectable Live Previewable Exposure Evaluation/Determination" shooting in Full Manual / M ISO mode completely eliminated light meter sensor reading TTL common from the film era, making optimally desired exposure selection with live preview rear monitor screens virtually "instant at a glance", and time was saved doing any spot/area evaluative light metering TTL, which non-ES-LV and totally non-LV DSLR users doing the TTL "light meter reading" routine, same as their film SLR counterparts.

The time saved assessing instant optimal exposure choices for any new or changing lit scenario, freed the ExpSim LV DSLR users to spend all their time shooting primarily with their optical viewfinder (OVF).

When interchangeable-lens DSLRs with STILLS only ExpSim LV (APS-C EOS 20Da, APS-H EOS 1DMkIII, Full Frame (FF) EOS 1DsMkIII), with its ExpSim LV having Full Manual / M/Auto-ISO mode and AE / M/Auto-ISO mode, ExpSim LV was extended for the first time in any interchangeable-lens DSLR to Canon's FF ExpSim LV (1080p) video in 5DMkIII, it was only then, did use of OVF shifted over, more to the rear lcd monitor to shoot Cinematic (larger FF sensor frame than pro digital Super35mm and 35mm Cine cameras).

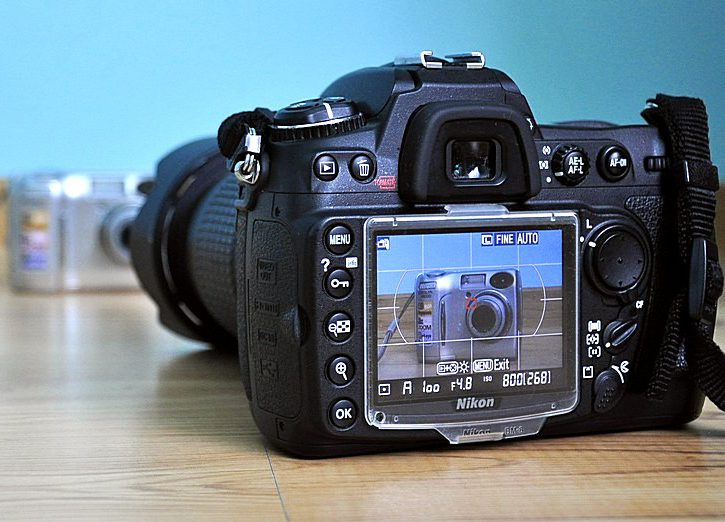
Live view on a Nikon D300

The lesser Autogain Framing/Focus Live preview, borrowed from framing/focus autogain live view digicams, in lesser autogain live view DSLRs does not typically serve as their principal means of framing and previewing before taking a photograph, with this function still being mainly performed with optical viewfinder. The first interchangeable-lens DSLR to feature framing live preview was the 2004 Fujifilm FinePix S3 Pro.

While initially largely a novelty feature, framing/focus only live-preview functionality from digicam framing/focus live view has become more common on DSLR cameras, and almost all new DSLRs have had the feature since mid-2008. This is particularly the case since the advent of movie mode common to digicam video features on these cameras.

The following lists, for each brand and DSLR product line, the first camera to have live preview (product lines that did not exist when live preview came into use are not shown; as of August 2014, there is no product line in which live preview has been abandoned after being introduced):

- Canon: 20Da, 40D, 450D, 1000D, 1D Mark III, 5D Mark II, 7D
- Fujifilm: FinePix S3 Pro, FinePix IS Pro
- Leica: Digilux 3
- Nikon: D90, D300, D700, D3
- Olympus: E-10, E-330, E-30, E-3
- Panasonic: DMC-L1
- Pentax: K20D, K-7, K-x
- Samsung: GX-20
- Sony: A300, A350, A500, A55, and A77

The principal function of live preview on Canon DSLRs from the 20Da onwards has been to allow, via LCD viewing, rapid acquisition of consistent and predictable exposure selection before taking a photograph via its 'exposure simulation' (ExpSim) enabled mode, or exposure priority display. This mode replaces the shortcomings of traditional estimation involved in the through-the-lens (TTL) metering techniques of the older framing type live view DSLRs with autogain/framing only, DSLRs without live view, as well as the shortcomings of optical viewfinders when ambient lighting becomes too low.

Real-time exposure simulation live preview (or exposure priority display) had been available in many prosumer cameras, such as the Canon PowerShot G series, before being available to in live view DSLRs. Some manufacturers of compact cameras, including prosumer models, still lack this exposure simulation live view feature, instead relying on the more rudimentary autogain/framing only live view, where slow focus and slow exposure estimation via TTL metering techniques are relied upon. Real-time exposure simulation capable live preview digital cameras make achieving the desired exposures, especially in manual modes, more quickly available for both still and video photography.

Among the DSLRs that do manage to focus using the standard phase-detection sensors used by DSLRs, unlike some compact digital cameras none has managed to show 100% frame coverage. This removes one of the key advantages of live preview over optical viewfinders, especially on more budget cameras. Additionally, 100% coverage optical viewfinders have recently become more common and affordable with the appearance of the Canon EOS 7D, Nikon D300, Olympus E-3 and the Pentax K-7. Still more recently, the (upper) mid-range Nikon D7000 has brought the feature to a somewhat lower price point.

Some real-time exposure simulated capable live preview digital cameras also offer live histogram graphs for tonal balance or color, where the graph changes instantaneously as exposure adjustments are made. Other features include live depth of field (DOF) preview, and live indication of overexposed areas of the image

Almost all modern bridge and compact cameras have a movie mode, while this feature only became available on DSLRs during 2008. The Nikon D90 with 720p video was announced in August 2008, and the Canon EOS 5D Mark II with 1080p video was announced in September 2008. The Canon EOS 5D Mark II was the first DSLR to offer full control over its real-time exposure simulation live preview for video, rather than just autogain/framing only live preview.

== Advantages ==
Live preview can show additional information, such as an image histogram, focal ratio, camera settings, battery charge, and remaining storage space. Some implementations have a focus peaking feature that highlights areas of the frame that are in focus. They are also in several ways more accurate than an optical viewfinder (OVF):

- Show the scene from the same viewpoint as the camera lens, without parallax.
- Cope with high zoom-ratio lenses, without needing a bulky reflex mirror.
- Show approximately how the scene will look under the chosen exposure, including white balance, saturation, effects etc.
- Show a low-light scene brighter than it would appear with an OVF, just like the final image will look like.
- Show 100% coverage of the final image.
- Live view can also be used in video mode (which is not possible in an OVF)

== Limitations ==
The Panasonic Lumix FZ80/82, a bridge camera with a smaller 1/2.3" sensor, tends to perform poorly in low light due to its sensor limitations.

Live preview has the following limitations:

- There may be a noticeable lag between the changes in the scene and the live view display.
- Very few live preview implementations lack automatic gain control and become virtually blank in low-light conditions.
- Live view of compact and bridge cameras with smaller sensors may be difficult to operate in darker environments and tends to lag severely.

Live preview has been in use with bridge cameras for some years but with limited resolution and image quality. They are used in most mirrorless modern system cameras (e.g. Panasonic Micro Four Third System, Sony NEX, Sony SLT, Nikon V1).

Many professional photographers and advanced amateurs prefer DSLR cameras that have a true optical through-the-lens viewfinder (OVF).

== See also ==
- Digital back
