= Olympus E-450 =

2009 Four Thirds digital single-lens reflex camera

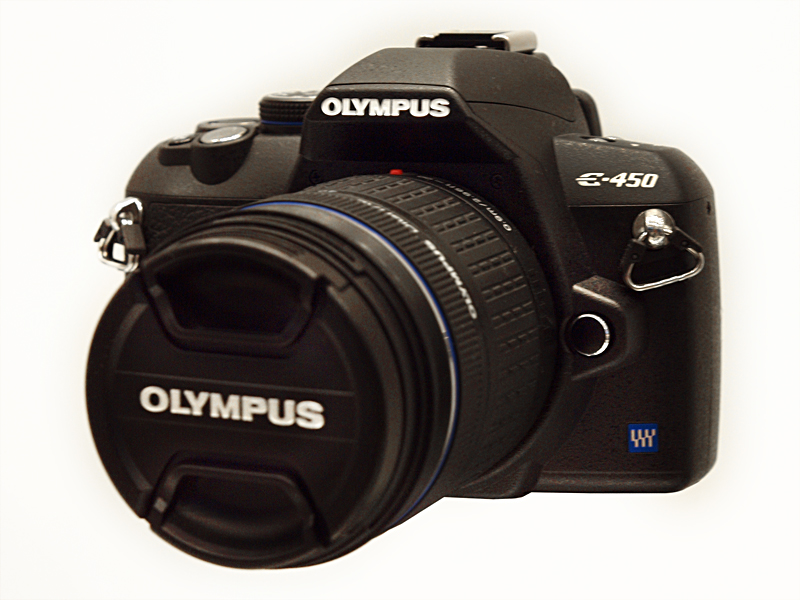

Overview
- Maker: Olympus Corporation
- Type: Digital single-lens reflex

Lens
- Lens: Interchangeable Four Thirds System

Sensor/medium
- Sensor: 18.00 mm × 13.50 mm Live MOS
- Maximum resolution: 3648 × 2736 (10 megapixels)
- Film speed: 100–1600
- Storage media: CompactFlash (CF) (Type I or Type II) + xD Picture Card

Exposure/metering
- Exposure modes: 49-zone multi-pattern
- Exposure metering: TTL open-aperture exposure
- Metering modes: Digital ESP, Centre-Weighted Average, Spot, Highlight based spot, Shadow based spot

Shutter
- Shutter: Computerized focal-plane
- Shutter speed range: 60 s – 1/4000 s
- Continuous shooting: 3.5 frame/s

Viewfinder
- Viewfinder: Optical TTL

General
- LCD screen: 2.7" TFT LCD, 230,000 pixels, live preview capable
- Battery: Lithium-Ion rechargeable
- Weight: 380 g (13 oz) or 0.84 lb (body only, no battery)
- Made in: China

The Olympus E-450 (or Olympus EVOLT E-450 in North America) is a 10.0 megapixel digital single-lens reflex (DSLR) camera made by Olympus and conforming to the Four Thirds System standard. E-450 was announced in March 2009, and shipping started in May the same year. E-450 is similar in size to its siblings in the E-4XX series, marketed as the smallest DSLRs in the world.

== Features ==
The E-450 is a slightly upgraded version of the E-420. The cameras are very similar - in fact, when the E-450 was announced the upgrades were considered notably few by reviewers. The main new features in the E-450:

- Three Art Filters, where the camera processes the image to give it a new appearance. The filters available in E-450 are Pop Art, giving the image a very saturated look, Soft Focus making the images look "dreamy" similar to the effect of a diffusion filter on the lens, and Pin Hole, which gives a vignetting effect and makes the image look like it was taken by a pinhole camera.
- TruePic III+ processor, an upgrade from the E-420 TruePic III processor.
- Increased buffer for continuous shooting: the E-450 can buffer 8 RAW files compared to E-420's 6.
- Improved luminance on the LCD screen.

As with its predecessors E-400, E-410 and E-420 the E-450 is notable for its portability, especially when coupled with the Olympus 25 mm f2.8 pancake lens. Its small size is achieved by omitting the side hand grip, in-body stabilisation, and larger battery featured in other Olympus dSLRs.

The E-450 uses Olympus' Supersonic Wave Filter to remove dust from the surface of the image sensor.

	2003	2004	2005	2006	2007	2008	2009	2010	2011	2012	2013
Flagship		E-1				E-3			E-5		
High-end							E-30				
Midrange							E-620				
Midrange								E-600			
Midrange				E-500	E-510		E-520				
Entry-level			E-300	E-330			E-450				
Entry-level				E-400	E-410		E-420				
