= Olympus E-5 =

Digital camera model

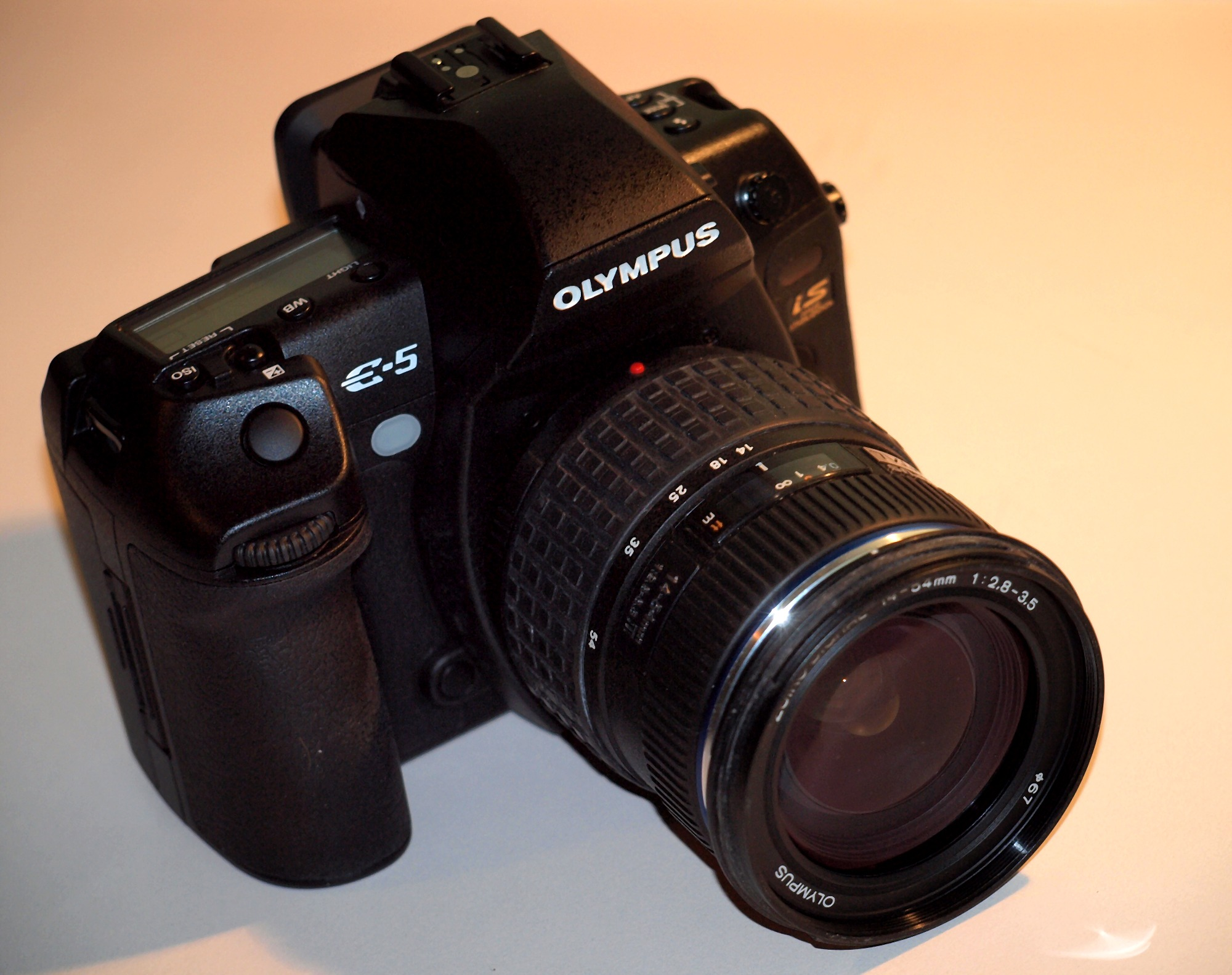

Overview
- Maker: Olympus Corporation
- Type: Digital single-lens reflex

Lens
- Lens: Interchangeable (Four Thirds System)

Sensor/medium
- Sensor: Four Thirds 17.3 mm x 13.0 mm Live MOS
- Maximum resolution: 4032 x 3024 pixels (12.3 megapixels)
- Storage media: CompactFlash(CF) or SD/SDHC/SSDXC

Focusing
- Focus modes: Single, continuous, manual
- Focus areas: 11 biaxial cross auto-focus points, selectable

Exposure/metering
- Exposure modes: Program, shutter-priority, aperture-priority, manual
- Exposure metering: TTL, evaluative (ESP), center-weighted, spot
- Metering modes: ESP multi patterned, Center-weighted average (60%), Spot (2%)

Flash
- Flash: built-in pop up flash GN=13 at ISO 100, wireless control for up to 3 external flash groups and 4 channels

Shutter
- Shutter: 1/8,000 to 60 s computerized focal plane shutter
- Continuous shooting: 5.0 frames per second (19 images RAW buffer)

Viewfinder
- Viewfinder: Optical TTL with pentaprism 100% field of view and ×1.15 magnification

General
- LCD screen: 3" 920,000 pixel TFT LCD on full articulating multi-angle screen with live preview
- Battery: Olympus BLM-1 1500 mAh; Olympus BLM-5 1620 mAh Lithium-ion battery
- Made in: China

The Olympus E-5 was Olympus Corporation's flagship camera, positioned as a professional DSLR camera. It is the successor to the Olympus E-3, which was launched on October 17, 2007. The E-5 was announced on September 14, 2010. The E-5, like the other cameras in the Olympus E-series, conforms to the Four Thirds System.

== Features ==
The E-5 has a live preview full articulating screen, contrast-detect autofocus in live view mode, and the ability to control up to three wireless flash groups without external transmitters. The camera is also fully weatherproof even with the popup flash in the "up" position when used with weatherproofed lenses such as the Zuiko Digital "High Grade" and "Super High Grade" lines. Like many recent DSLR's, it can record video; the E-5 supports resolutions up to 720p. It is very similar to the E-3 that preceded it in operation and design.

Additional features include:

- Fast autofocus. As of September 2010, Olympus claimed that this was the world's fastest autofocus when used with the Olympus Zuiko Digital ED 12-60mm f/2.8-4 SWD lens at 60 mm.
- 100% viewfinder with ×1.15 magnification with a 50 mm lens (as 25 mm is the "standard" lens on the 4/3 format, this is equivalent to ×0.57 in 35 mm format)
- External white balance sensor
- 5 frames per second (frame/s) capture speed
- 11 point biaxial cross AF sensor that works at −2 EV at ISO 100
- Sensor-shift image stabilization which can be used with any lens
- Environmentally sealed magnesium alloy camera body
- Dust reduction system (Supersonic Wave Filter)
- Shutter tested to 150,000 cycles
- Internal Viewfinder shutter
- 'X' sync and External remote ports

The camera is compatible with existing BLM-1 batteries used in the E-1, E-3, E-300, E-30, E-500 and E-510. It weighs 800 grams.

Recent iterations of Olympus DSLR's (including the E-420, E-520, E-620, E-30, and E-3) have used a relatively strong antialias filter. This has the effect of eliminating moire and aliasing artifacts, but reduces the camera's ability to capture very fine detail when used with very sharp lenses. In the E-5, Olympus has chosen to use a much weaker antialias filter along with a new software demosaicing/sharpening algorithm that is claimed to preserve fine detail while eliminating moire. In principle this approach allows the E-5 to capture more fine detail than cameras with similar resolution (when used with sufficiently sharp lenses).

Along with other Olympus 4/3rds bodies, the E-5 has an on-demand pixel mapping, a dust reduction system, vignetting and distortion correction either in-camera or during editing with Olympus software. The camera has ten filters built in and photographers can include their own information into each photo's Exif data.

	2003	2004	2005	2006	2007	2008	2009	2010	2011	2012	2013
Flagship		E-1				E-3			E-5		
High-end							E-30				
Midrange							E-620				
Midrange								E-600			
Midrange				E-500	E-510		E-520				
Entry-level			E-300	E-330			E-450				
Entry-level				E-400	E-410		E-420				
