= Olympus E-420 =

Camera produced by Olympus

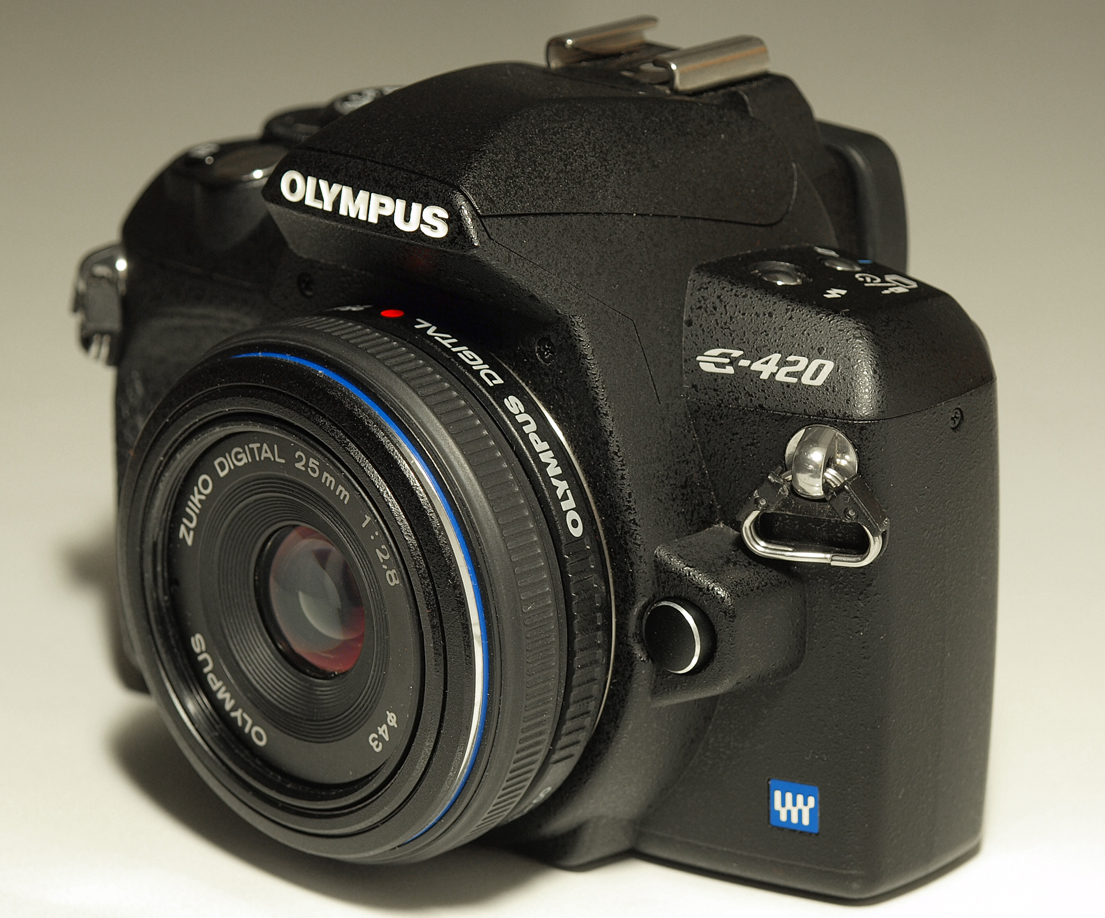
- E-420 with a 25mm pancake lens

Overview
- Maker: Olympus Corporation
- Type: Digital single-lens reflex

Lens
- Lens: Interchangeable Four Thirds System

Sensor/medium
- Sensor: 17.3 x 13.0 mm Live MOS
- Maximum resolution: 3648 × 2736 (10 megapixels)
- Film speed: 100 - 1600
- Storage media: CompactFlash (CF) (Type I or Type II) + xD Picture Card

Exposure/metering
- Exposure modes: 49-zone multi-pattern
- Exposure metering: TTL open-aperture exposure
- Metering modes: Digital ESP, Centre-Weighted Average, Spot, Highlight based spot, Shadow based spot

Shutter
- Shutter: Computerized focal-plane
- Shutter speed range: 60 s - 1/4000 s
- Continuous shooting: 3.5 frame/s

Viewfinder
- Viewfinder: Optical TTL

General
- LCD screen: 2.7" TFT LCD, 230,000 pixels, live preview capable
- Battery: Lithium-Ion rechargeable
- Weight: 370 g (13 oz) (body only, no battery)
- Made in: China

The Olympus E-420 (or Olympus EVOLT E-420 in North America) is a 10 megapixel digital single-lens reflex (DSLR) camera made by Olympus. The camera conforms to the Four Thirds System standard, and together with its siblings in the E-4XX series, it is marketed as the smallest DSLR in the world.

== Features ==
As with the E-400 (in Europe only) and E-410 before it, the E-420 is notable for its portability, especially when coupled with the simultaneously released Olympus 25mm f2.8 pancake lens. In addition to being based on the inherently more compact Four-Thirds system, its diminutive size is achieved by the use of a substantially smaller right hand grip than found on most dSLRs (similar to the grip design used on the E-400 and E-410, but with an added "ridge" for comfort and stability), as well as the continued exclusion of Olympus' well-known sensor-shift image stabilization from the package.

The E-420 uses Olympus' Supersonic Wave Filter to remove dust from the surface of the image sensor.

The E-420 was announced in March 2008 to replace the E-410, and shipping started two months later. In North America, it is marketed as the EVOLT E-420.

Advantages over the E-410 include Face Detection Technology for up to 8 faces, Imager AF (contrast-detect autofocus) in Live View mode with certain lenses (which provides 11 autofocus points as opposed to the usual 3), a redesigned grip, Shadow Adjustment Technology for greater perceived dynamic range, and wireless flash control for up to 3 flash units.

== Storage ==
According to the official specification, the E-420 can accept up to an 8 GB CF memory card.

== Gallery ==
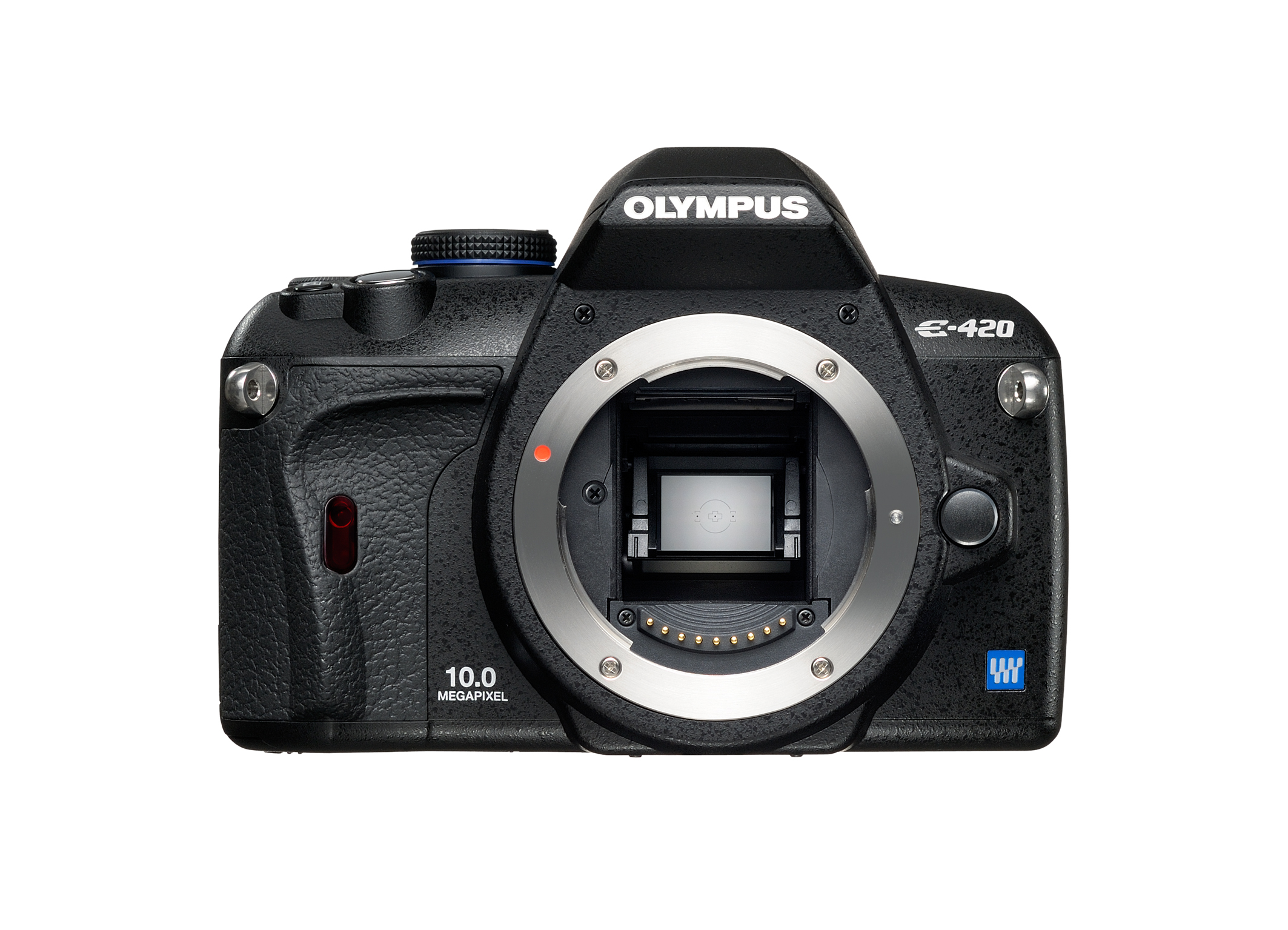
Front view, body only.

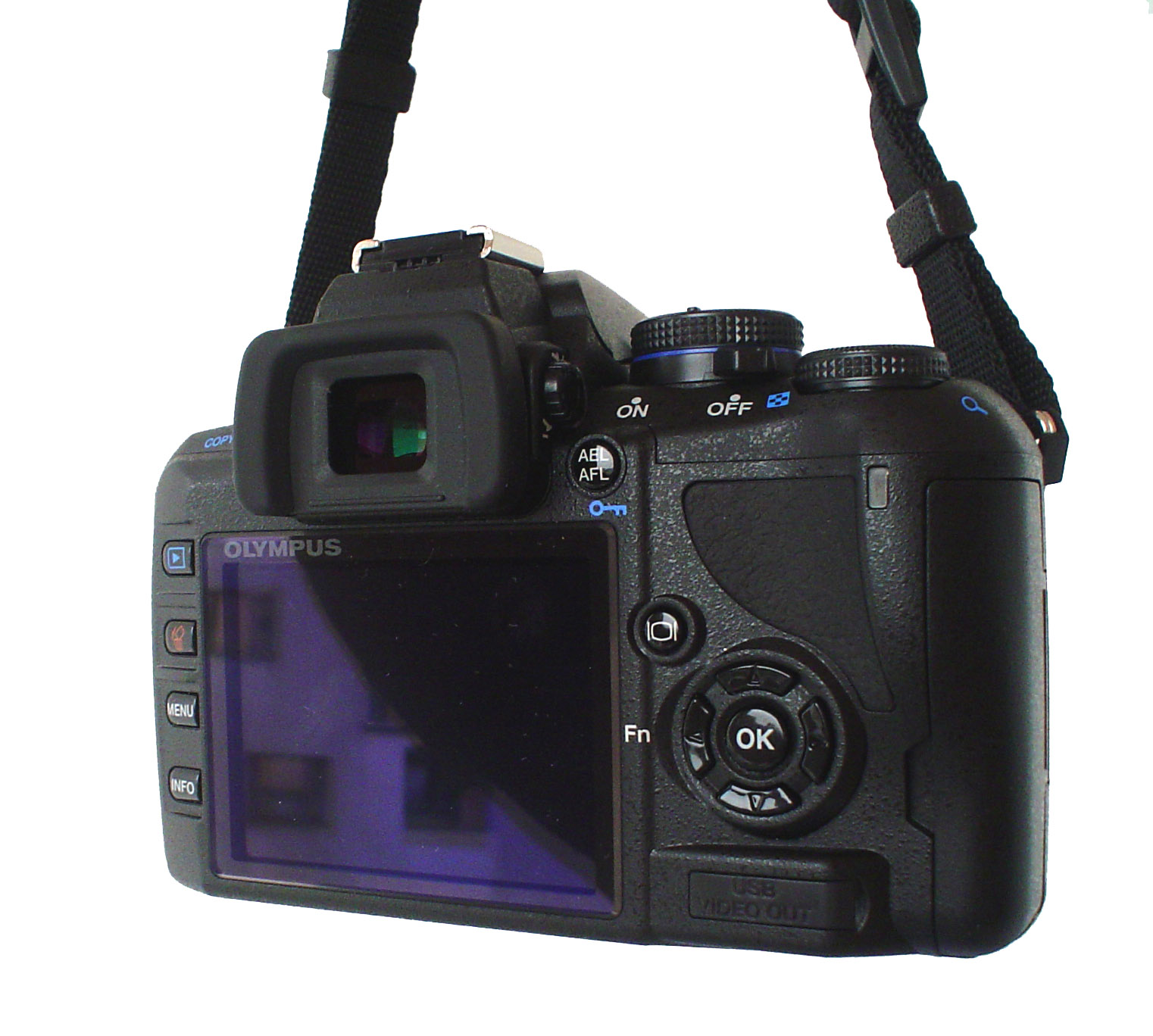
Rear view.

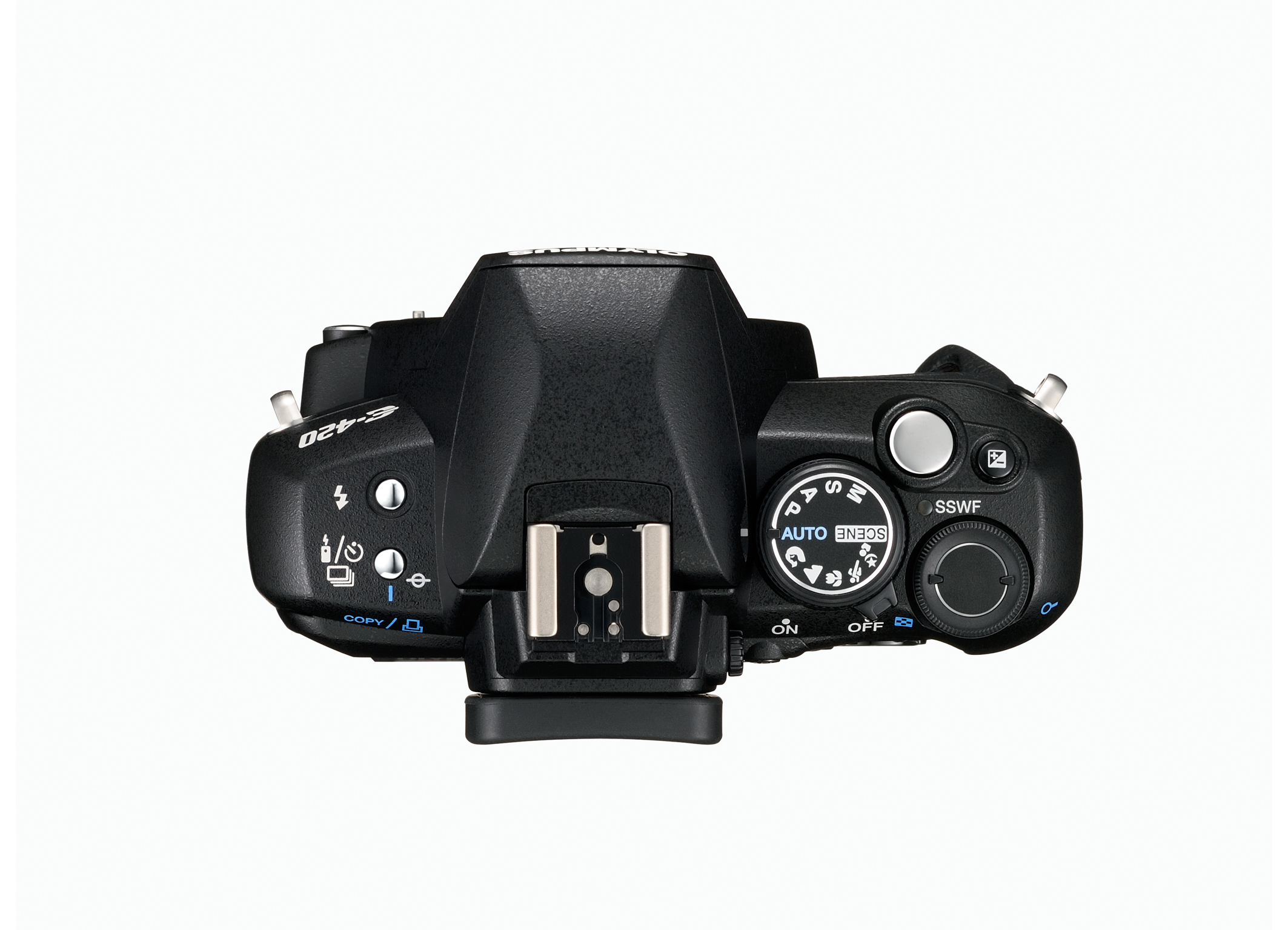
Top view.

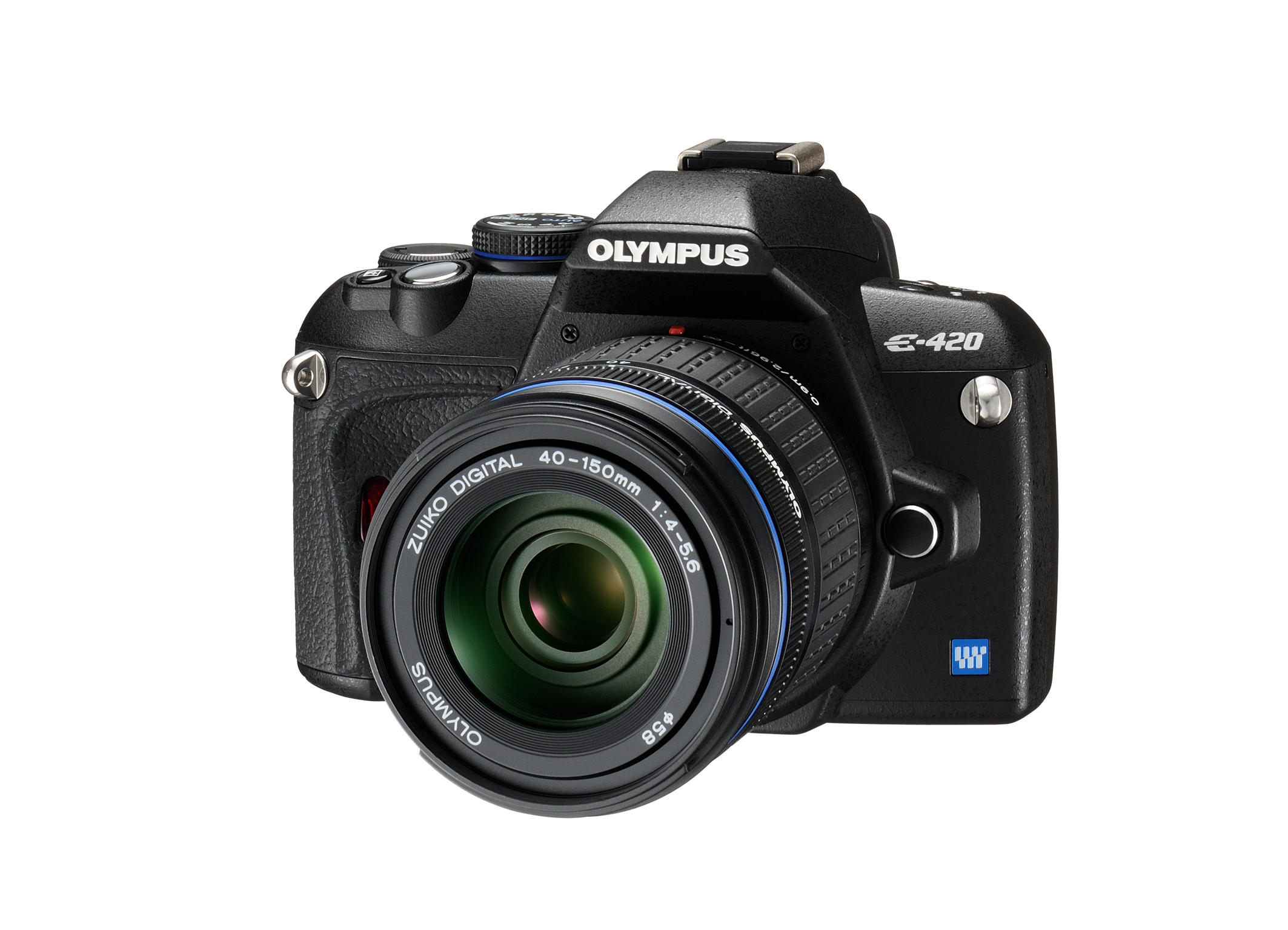
With 40–150 mm kit lens.

	2003	2004	2005	2006	2007	2008	2009	2010	2011	2012	2013
Flagship		E-1				E-3			E-5		
High-end							E-30				
Midrange							E-620				
Midrange								E-600			
Midrange				E-500	E-510		E-520				
Entry-level			E-300	E-330			E-450				
Entry-level				E-400	E-410		E-420				
