= Olympus E-30 =

Digital camera model

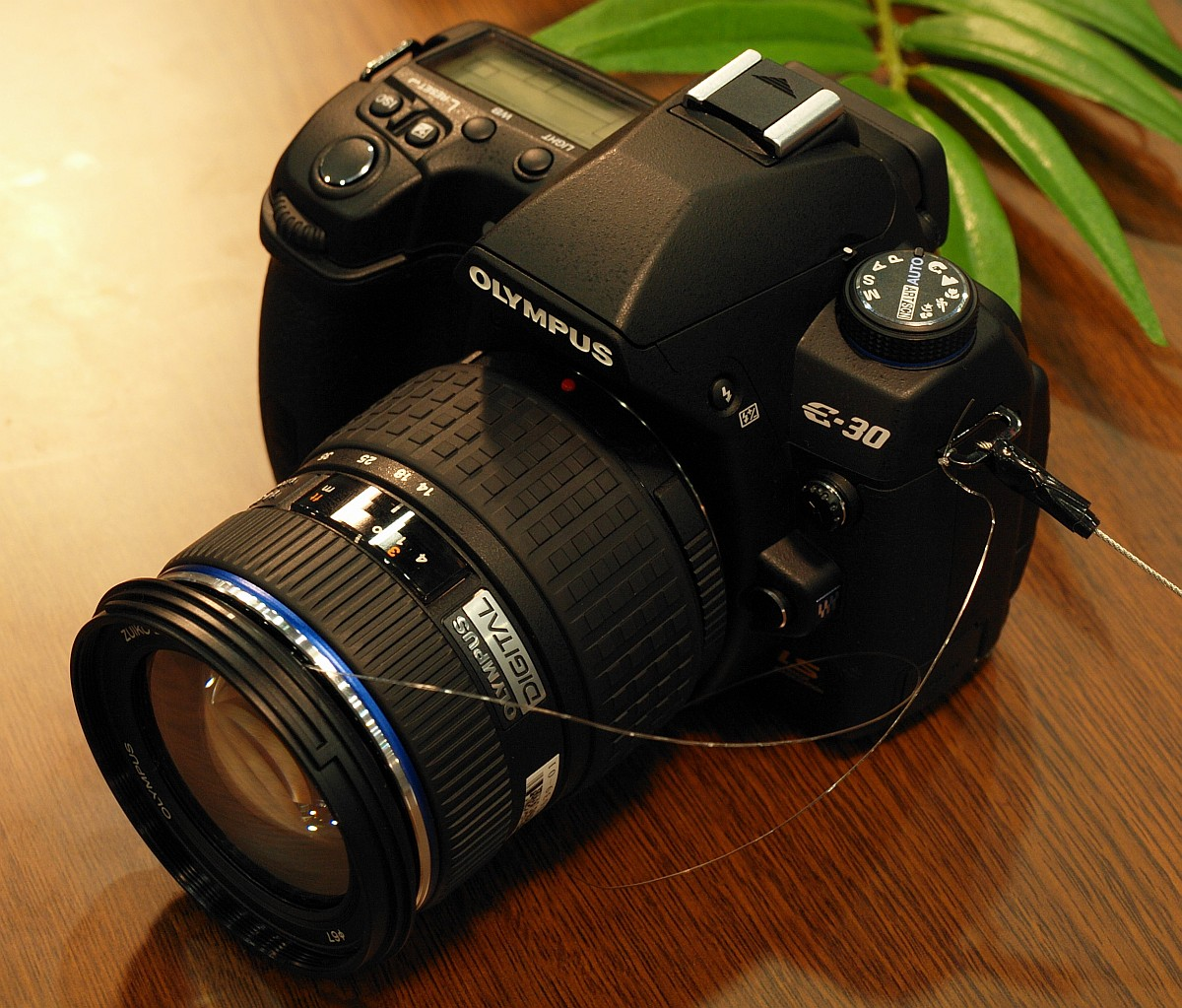

Overview
- Maker: Olympus Corporation
- Type: Digital single-lens reflex camera

Lens
- Lens: Four Thirds

Sensor/medium
- Sensor: Live MOS Four Thirds 17.3 mm x 13.0 mm(2× conversion factor)
- Maximum resolution: 12.3 million effective pixels, 4032 x 3024 pixels
- Film speed: ISO 100 to 3200
- Storage media: CompactFlash Type I/II (UDMA), Microdrive, xD-Picture Card

Focusing
- Focus modes: Single Shot AF, Single Shot AF + MF, Continuous AF + MF, Continuous AF, Manual Focus
- Focus areas: 11-point TTL Phase Difference Detection AF

Exposure/metering
- Exposure modes: Auto, Program AE with shift), Aperture Priority AE, Shutter Priority AE, Manual, Scene Program, Scene Select (Scene Modes: Portrait, Landscape, Macro, Sport, Night + Portrait, Children, High Key, Low Key, DIS Mode, Nature Macro, Candle, Sunset, Fireworks, Documents)
- Exposure metering: TTL Open-Aperture Metering System (49 Zones)

Flash
- Flash: E-TTL II automatic built-in pop-up, 13 m ISO 100 guide number, 27 mm (equivalent in 135 format) lens focal length coverage; compatible with Canon EX Series Speedlite external hotshoe-mount flashes

Shutter
- Shutter: focal-plane shutter
- Shutter speed range: 60-1/8000 seconds, bulb shooting
- Continuous shooting: 5.0 frame/s (RAW 12 frames maximum)

Viewfinder
- Viewfinder: Eye-Level TTL Optical Pentaprism with 98% coverage and 1.02X magnification

Image processing
- WB bracketing: ±3 stops in 1-stop increments;

General
- LCD screen: Vari-Angle 2.7" HyperCrystal III TFT LCD with 230,000 pixels
- Battery: BLM-1 Li-ion battery pack
- Weight: 730 g (26 oz) (1.6 lb)
- Made in: China

The Olympus E-30 is a Four Thirds System camera produced between December 2008 and about 2011. It was the only two-digit model in the E DSLR series, positioned between the Olympus E-520 and the E-3 cameras in terms of size, weight, capabilities and price. It was sold in a kit with the Olympus Zuiko Digital 14-54mm f/2.8-3.5 II lens.

	2003	2004	2005	2006	2007	2008	2009	2010	2011	2012	2013
Flagship		E-1				E-3			E-5		
High-end							E-30				
Midrange							E-620				
Midrange								E-600			
Midrange				E-500	E-510		E-520				
Entry-level			E-300	E-330			E-450				
Entry-level				E-400	E-410		E-420				
