= Olympus E-3 =

2010 Four Thirds digital single-lens reflex camera

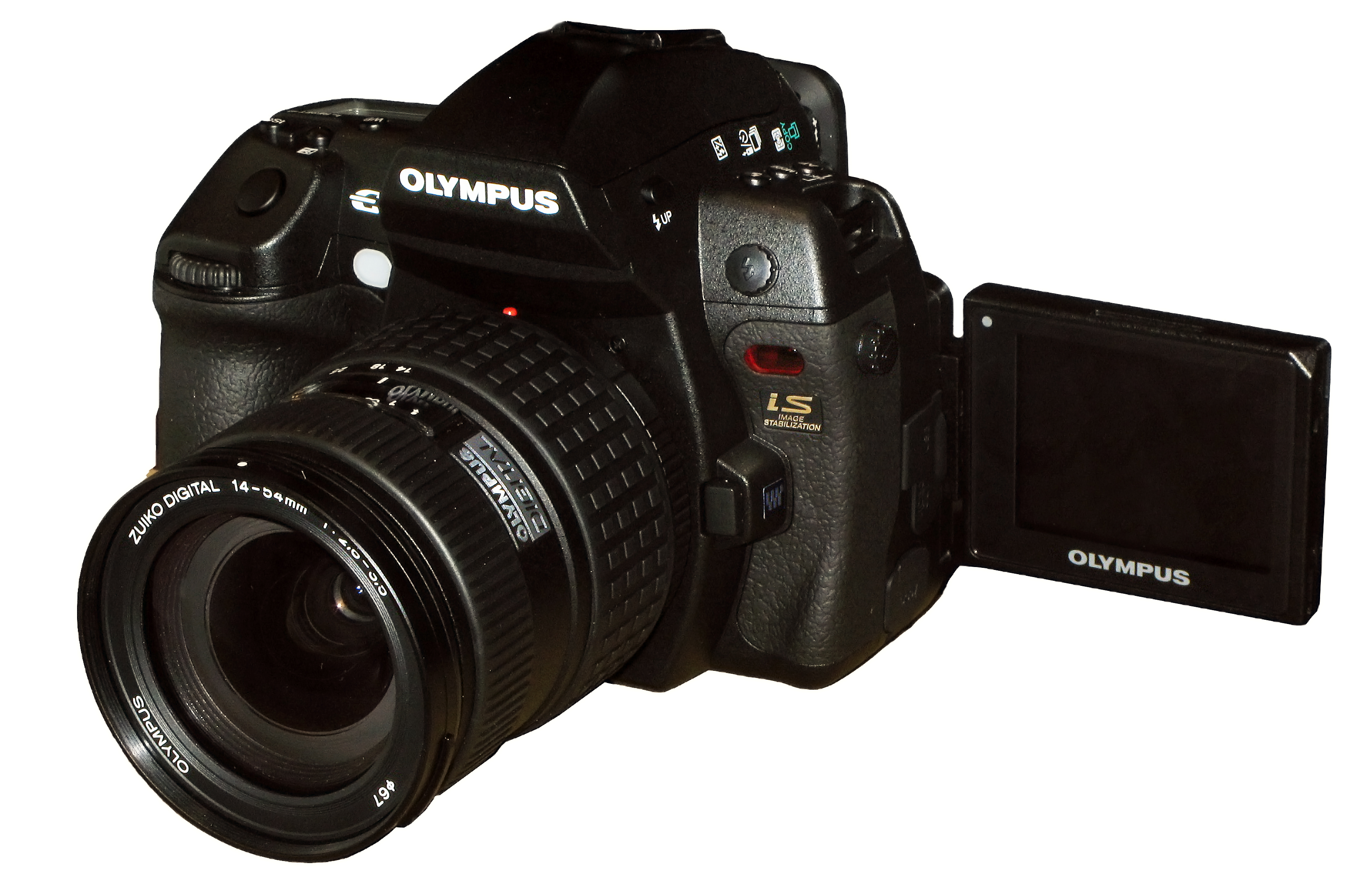

Overview
- Maker: Olympus Corporation
- Type: Digital single-lens reflex

Lens
- Lens: Interchangeable (Four Thirds System)

Sensor/medium
- Sensor: Four Thirds System 18.00 × 13.50 mm Live MOS
- Maximum resolution: 3648 × 2736 (10.1 megapixels)
- Storage media: CompactFlash(CF) or XD Picture-Card

Focusing
- Focus modes: Single, continuous, manual
- Focus areas: 11 biaxial cross auto-focus points, selectable

Exposure/metering
- Exposure modes: Program, shutter-priority, aperture-priority, manual
- Exposure metering: TTL, evaluative (ESP), center-weighted, spot
- Metering modes: ESP multi patterned, Center-weighted average (60%), Spot (2%)

Flash
- Flash: built-in pop up flash GN=13 at ISO 100, wireless control for up to 3 external flash groups and 4 channels

Shutter
- Shutter: 1/8,000 to 60 s computerized focal plane shutter
- Continuous shooting: 5.0 frames per second (19 images RAW buffer)

Viewfinder
- Viewfinder: Optical TTL with pentaprism 100% field of view and ×1.15 magnification

General
- LCD screen: 2.5" 230,000 pixel TFT LCD on full articulating multi-angle screen with live preview
- Battery: Olympus BLM-1 1500mAh Lithium-ion battery
- Made in: China

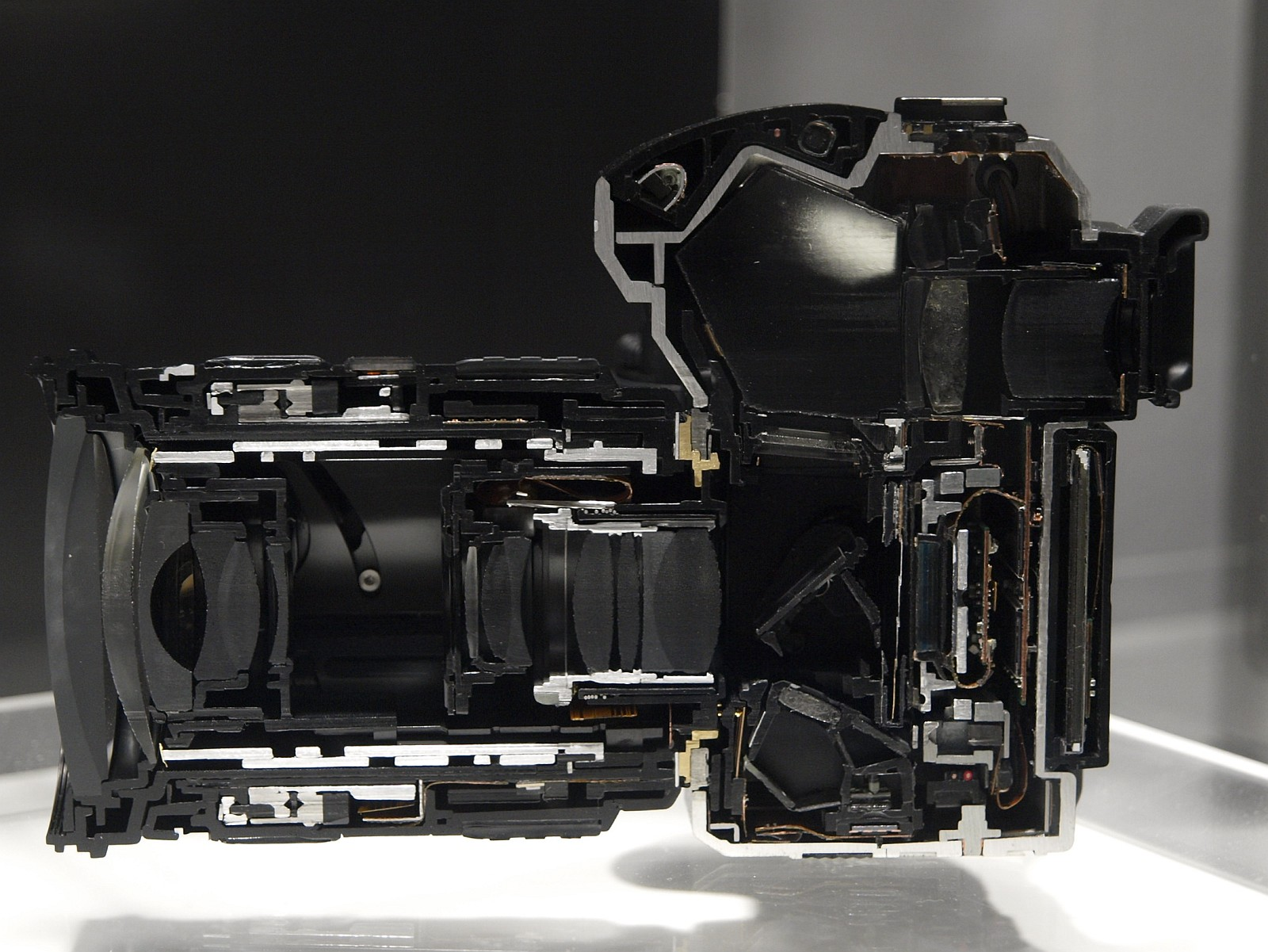
E-3 with Zuiko Digital ED 12-60mm F2.8-4.0 SWD. Cut model.

The Olympus E-3 was until 2010 Olympus Corporation's flagship camera, positioned as a professional DSLR camera. It is the successor to the Olympus E-1, which was launched in November 2003. The E-3, originally codenamed Olympus E-P1, was announced on 17 October 2007. The E-3, like the other cameras in the Olympus E-series, conforms to the Four Thirds system. It was succeeded in 2010 by the Olympus E-5 professional DSLR flagship camera.

== Features ==
The E-3 has several novel features, including a live preview full articulating screen, autofocus in live view mode, the ability to capture a scene with wide dynamic range using an image processing method called shadow adjustment technology and the ability to control up to three wireless flash groups without external transmitters. The camera is also fully weatherproof even with the popup flash in the "up" position.

The camera, with the new SWD (ultrasonic motor) lenses, is expected to appeal to professional users who want a rugged, portable and lightweight camera body with quality lenses and class leading autofocus.

Additional features include:

- Fast autofocus (Olympus claims that this was the world's fastest autofocus at the time the camera was released (when used with the Olympus Zuiko Digital ED 12-60mm f/2.8-4 SWD lens at 60mm, as of October 2007).
- 100% viewfinder with ×1.15 magnification with a 50 mm lens (as 25 mm is the "standard" lens on the 4/3 format, this is equivalent to ×0.57 in 35 mm format)
- External white balance sensor
- 5 frames per second (frame/s) capture speed
- 11 point biaxial cross AF sensor that works at −2 EV at ISO 100
- In-body image stabilization achieved by moving the sensor (thus, it works with any lens)
- Environmentally sealed magnesium alloy camera body
- Dust reduction system (Supersonic Wave Filter)
- Shutter tested to 150,000 cycles
- Internal Viewfinder shutter
- 'X' sync and External remote ports

The camera is compatible with existing BLM-1 batteries used in the E-1, E-300, E-330, E-500 and E-510.

The camera was reviewed by Digital Photography Review in February 2008 by Simon Joinson.

The E-3 is equipped with a better sensor than other DSLRs marketed by Olympus at the time of its release, allowing the user to operate at higher ISO settings without producing as much noise.

Along with other Olympus 4/3rds bodies, the E-3 has a very 'maintenance free' approach due to it having on-demand pixel mapping, the SSWF 'dust shaker', vignetting and distortion correction either in-camera or during editing with Olympus software. Olympus have also implemented on-demand firmware updates for all their bodies, lens and flash units.

	2003	2004	2005	2006	2007	2008	2009	2010	2011	2012	2013
Flagship		E-1				E-3			E-5		
High-end							E-30				
Midrange							E-620				
Midrange								E-600			
Midrange				E-500	E-510		E-520				
Entry-level			E-300	E-330			E-450				
Entry-level				E-400	E-410		E-420				
