= Olympus E-410 =

Digital camera model

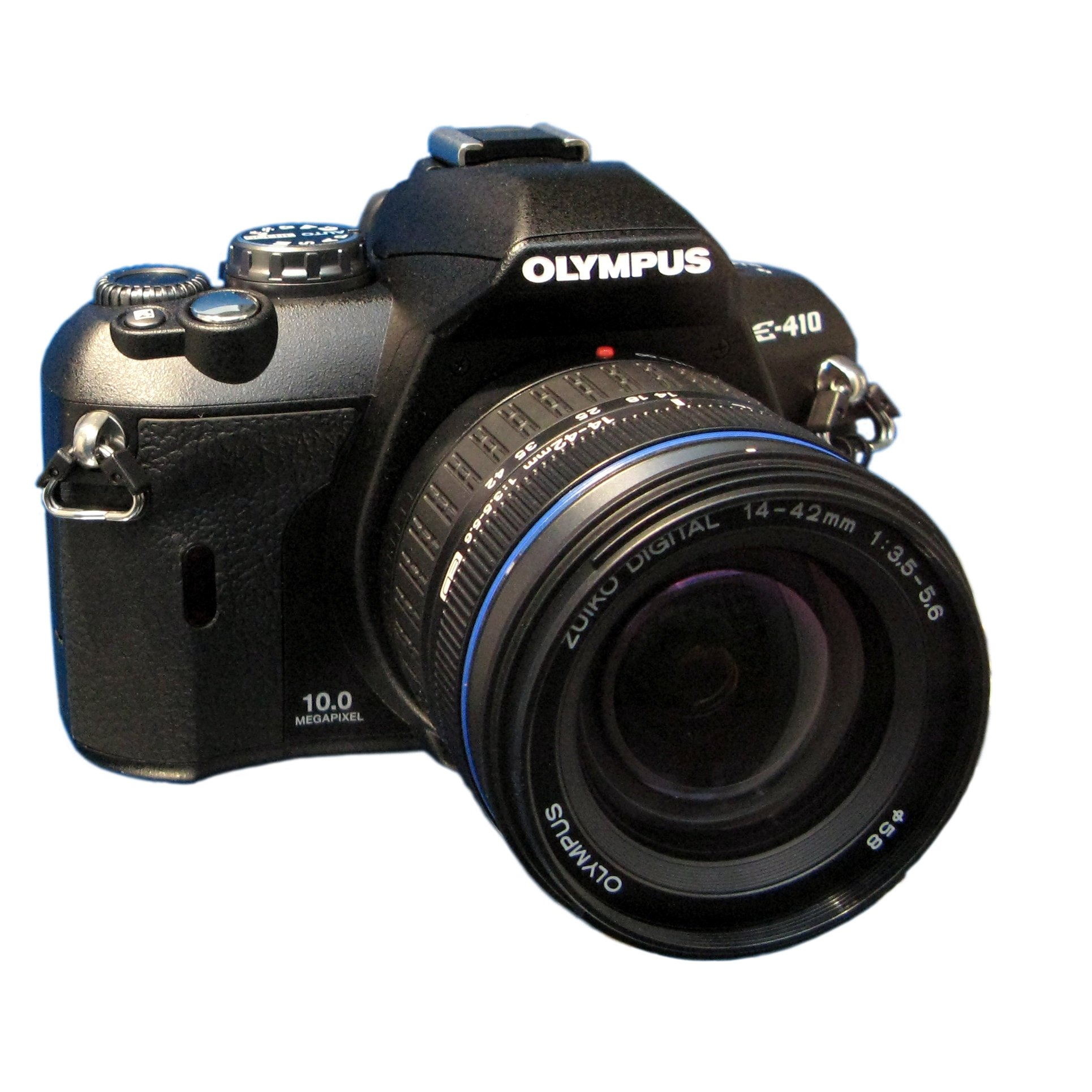

Overview
- Maker: Olympus Corporation
- Type: Digital single-lens reflex

Lens
- Lens: Interchangeable Four Thirds System

Sensor/medium
- Sensor: 18.00 x 13.50 mm Live MOS
- Maximum resolution: 3648 × 2736 (10 megapixels)
- Film speed: 100 - 1600
- Storage media: CompactFlash (CF) (Type I or Type II) + xD Picture Card

Focusing
- Focus areas: 3-point TTL Phase Diff

Exposure/metering
- Exposure modes: 49-zone multi-pattern
- Metering modes: Digital ESP, Centre-Weighted Average, Spot, Highlight based spot, Shadow based spot

Shutter
- Shutter speed range: 60 s - 1/4000 s
- Continuous shooting: 3.0 frame/s

Viewfinder
- Viewfinder: Optical TTL

General
- LCD screen: 2.5" TFT LCD, 215,000 pixels, live preview capable
- Battery: Lithium-Ion rechargeable
- Weight: 375 g (13 oz) (body only)
- Made in: China

The Olympus E-410 (or Olympus EVOLT E-410 in North America) is a 10 megapixel digital single-lens reflex (DSLR) camera intended to be the smallest and lightest DSLR on the market. Announced in March 2007 to succeed the E-400 (which was only marketed in Europe), it adds a live preview function and a new "Olympus TruePic III" processing chip that is claimed to provide better performance.

The E-410 body and lens mount conform to the Four Thirds System standard, providing compatibility with other lenses for that system. (Four Thirds System lenses are smaller and lighter than lenses with similar specifications from other DSLR systems.)

Like the E-400, the E-410 is notable for its small size, omitting the hand grip and exploiting the smaller sensor of the Four Thirds System. It weighs only 375g and approaches manual focus film SLR sizes, reminiscent of the Olympus OM system. It is accompanied by two new small zoom lenses, a 14–42 mm (28–84 mm 135 film format equivalent) f/3.5–5.6 standard zoom weighing 190g and a 40–150 mm (80–300 mm equivalent) f/4.0–5.6 long zoom weighing 220g.

The E-410 uses Olympus' patented Supersonic Wave Filter dust reduction system to shake dust from the sensor during startup and when requested by the user; this largely eliminates the problem of dust accumulation on the surface of the image sensor.

The camera was succeeded by the E-420. This newer camera's most notable enhancement over the E-410 is a contrast autofocusing system, for faster shooting in Live View mode.

	2003	2004	2005	2006	2007	2008	2009	2010	2011	2012	2013
Flagship		E-1				E-3			E-5		
High-end							E-30				
Midrange							E-620				
Midrange								E-600			
Midrange				E-500	E-510		E-520				
Entry-level			E-300	E-330			E-450				
Entry-level				E-400	E-410		E-420				
