= Olympus E-400 =

Digital camera model

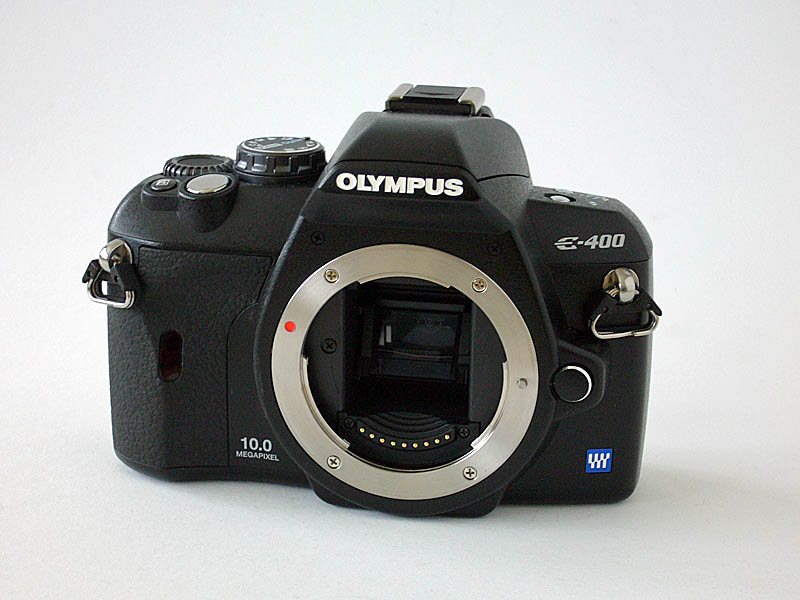

Overview
- Maker: Olympus Corporation
- Type: Digital single-lens reflex

Lens
- Lens: Interchangeable Four Thirds mount

Sensor/medium
- Sensor: 17.3 x 13.0 mm Four Thirds System Kodak KAI-10100 RGB CCD sensor 2x FOV crop
- Maximum resolution: 3648 x 2736 (10 effective Megapixels)
- Film speed: ISO 100–1600 in 1/3 steps Noise warning for > ISO 800
- Storage media: Compact Flash (Type I and II), xD Picture card

Focusing
- Focus modes: Single AF ( S-AF ) Continuous AF ( C-AF ) Manual Focus ( MF ) S-AF + MF; C-AF + MF
- Focus areas: 3 points TTL Phase Diff

Exposure/metering
- Exposure modes: Auto; Program automatic Aperture priority Shutter priority Manual; Scene modes
- Exposure metering: TTL open-aperture 49-zone multi-pattern Range: 1 to 20 EV (50 mm F2, ISO 100)
- Metering modes: Digital ESP; Centre weighted Spot; Highlight based Spot; Shadow based Spot

Flash
- Flash: Built in Pop-up, Guide number 10 m at ISO 100, hotshoe

Shutter
- Shutter speed range: 60–1/4000 s
- Continuous shooting: 3 frame/s up to 10 frames (approx.) in HQ JPEG mode 3 frame/s up to 5 frames (RAW)

Viewfinder
- Viewfinder: Optical 0.92x Pentaprism

Image processing
- White balance: 7 / +7 steps in each R-B / G-M axis

General
- LCD screen: 6.4 cm / 2.5″ TFT LCD, 215,000 pixels
- Battery: Lithium-Ion rechargeable
- Weight: 375 g (13 oz) (body only)

The Olympus E-400 is a digital single-lens reflex camera launched by Olympus on 14 September 2006, using the Four Thirds System lens mount standard. This 10 megapixel camera could be compared to other DSLRs unveiled during the summer of 2006 with comparable pixel count and price range: the Sony α 100, the Nikon D80, the Canon EOS 400D and the Pentax K10D.

== Features ==
The E-400 is notable for its small size, omitting the hand grip and exploiting the smaller sensor. It weighs only 375g and approaches manual focus film SLRs sizes, reminiscent of the Olympus OM system. It was accompanied by two new small zoom lenses, a 14–42 mm (28–84 mm 135 film format equivalent) f/3.5–5.6 standard zoom weighing 190g and a 40–150 mm (80–300 mm equivalent) f/4.0–5.6 long zoom weighing 220g. The body and single lens kit have a 700GB£ MSRP and 850GB£ for the two lens kit.

The E-400, like all of the Olympus E-system cameras, uses Olympus' patented Supersonic Wave Filter dust reduction system to shake dust from the sensor during startup and when requested by the user; this largely eliminates the problem of dust accumulation on the surface of the image sensor.

The E-400 was controversial because Olympus only marketed it in Europe. The rest of the world had to wait for the E-410, which did not arrive until the spring of 2007 and did not include the same Kodak sensor as the E-400. The E-410 replaced the Kodak sensor with the Panasonic sensor. Some claim the Kodak sensor produced smoother gradations and a higher quality image at lower ISO numbers.

	2003	2004	2005	2006	2007	2008	2009	2010	2011	2012	2013
Flagship		E-1				E-3			E-5		
High-end							E-30				
Midrange							E-620				
Midrange								E-600			
Midrange				E-500	E-510		E-520				
Entry-level			E-300	E-330			E-450				
Entry-level				E-400	E-410		E-420				
