= Olympus E-1 =

Digital camera model

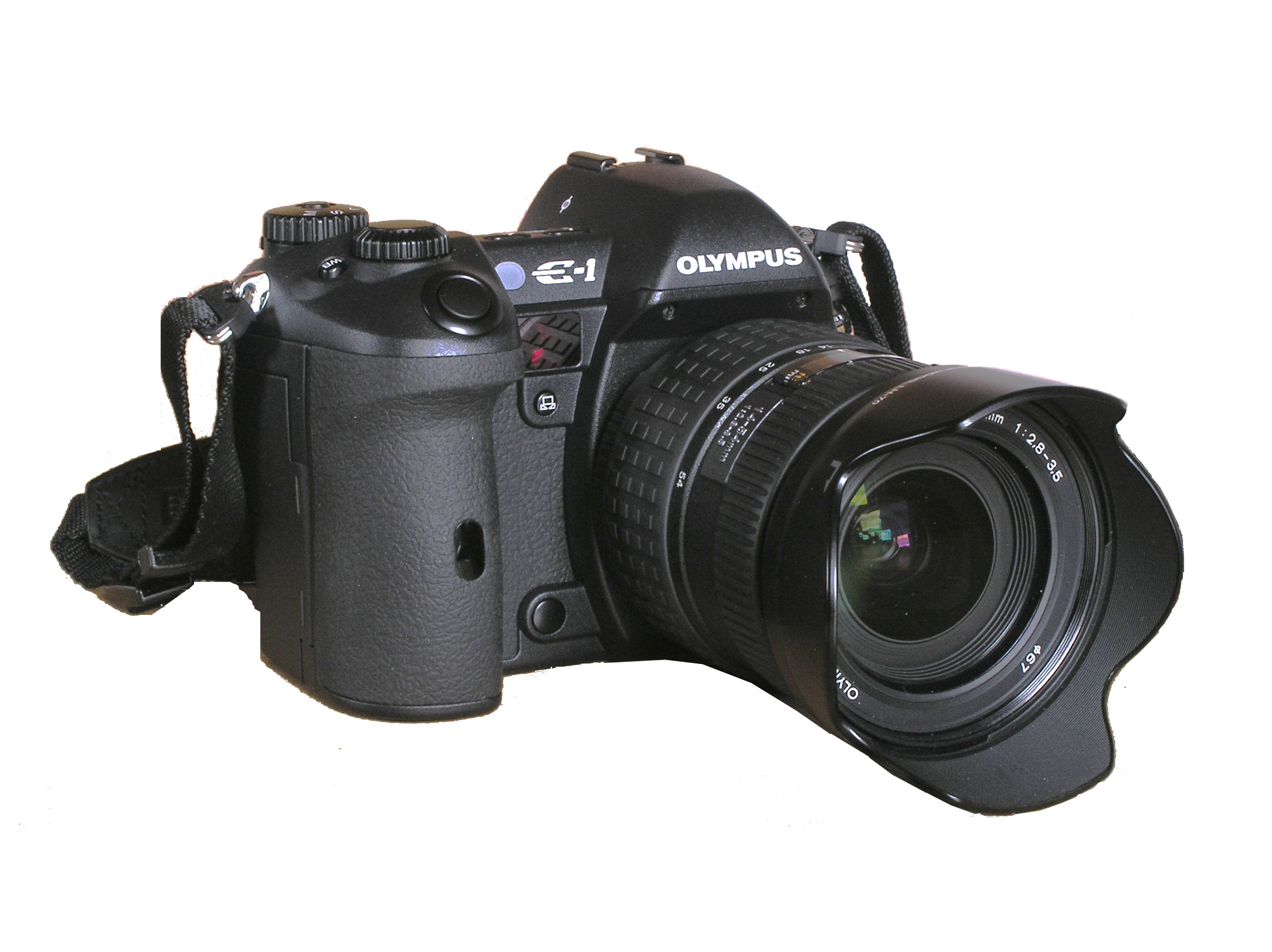

Overview
- Maker: Olympus Corporation
- Type: Digital single-lens reflex

Lens
- Lens: Interchangeable (Four Thirds System)

Sensor/medium
- Sensor: Kodak KAF-5101C Four Thirds System FFT CCD
- Maximum resolution: 2,560 × 1,920 (4.9 million)
- Film speed: ISO 100-800 with 1600 or 3200 in 'ISO Boost' mode
- Storage media: CompactFlash (CF) (Type I or Type II), Microdrive compatible

Focusing
- Focus modes: Single, continuous, manual
- Focus areas: 3 auto-focus points, selectable

Exposure/metering
- Exposure modes: Program, shutter-priority, aperture-priority, manual
- Exposure metering: TTL, evaluative (ESP), center-weighted, spot
- Metering modes: ESP multi patterned, Center-weighted average (60%), Spot (2%)

Shutter
- Shutter: Focal-plane shutter, all speeds electronically controlled
- Shutter speed range: 1/4,000 to 60 s, bulb up to 8 minutes
- Continuous shooting: 3.0 frame/s, up to 12 frames in any format

Viewfinder
- Viewfinder: Optical TTL with pentaprism 100% field of view

General
- LCD screen: 1.8 inch TFT LCD, 134,000 pixels
- Battery: Olympus BLM-1 1500mAh Lithium-ion battery
- Weight: 23 oz (650 g) without battery or storage card
- Made in: Japan

The Olympus E-1, introduced in 2003, was the first DSLR system camera designed from the ground up for digital photography This contrasts with its contemporaries which offered systems based on reused parts from previous 135 film systems, modified to fit with a sensor size of APS-C.

== Features ==
The E-1 uses the Four Thirds System lens mount and imaging system. This design choice means that because the CCD is smaller than a 35 mm negative, Four Thirds System lenses and camera bodies can be made smaller and lighter than those of preceding SLRs.

Characteristics:

- Lighter/more compact than contemporary DSLR bodies
- 5 megapixel CCD
- Magnesium-alloy body
- Environmental sealing (splash proof)
- "Supersonic Wave Filter" dust reduction system cleans CCD at each camera start-up (dust is shaken off the CCD)
- USB 2.0 and FireWire connectivity
- Continuous shooting 3 frames per second up to 12 frames
- Hybrid white balance sensor (on external surface of camera and using CCD)
- User upgradeable firmware

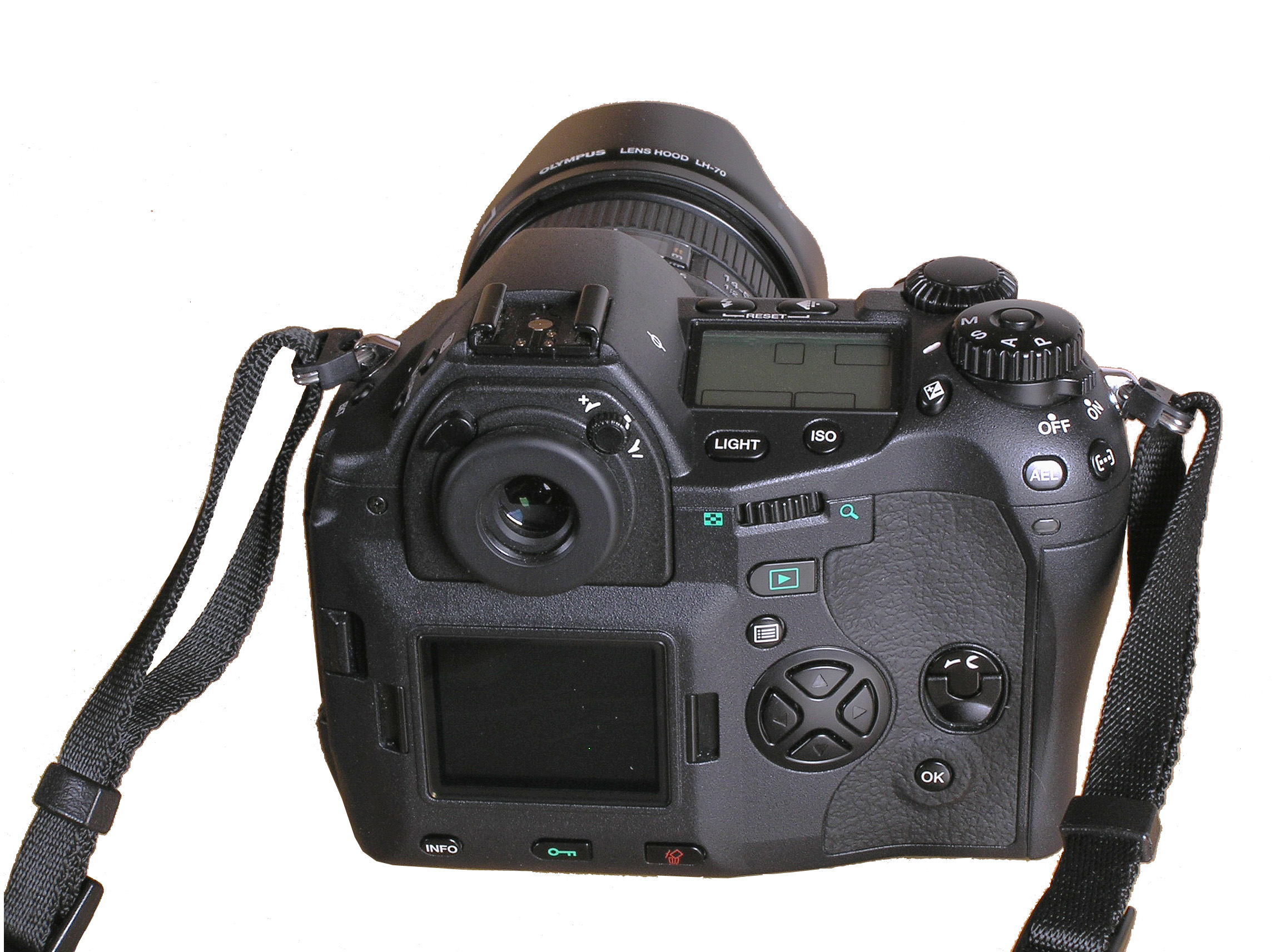
Rear view.

Sometimes the user experiences bright spots in long (greater than a few seconds) exposures. This is called long exposure noise. By turning on the "Noise Removal" (not "Noise Filter"), the E-1 will do a “dark frame subtraction” to get rid of these erroneous bright spots.

The development of the E-1 involved the revitalization of Olympus' old Zuiko lens brand, through a new range named "Zuiko Digital" with the Four Thirds system lens mount. The E-1 was usually sold bundled with a splash proof Zuiko Digital 14–54 mm 1:2.8–3.5 zoom lens.

Olympus initially gave away free adapters to connect OM lenses to the new Four Thirds System mount. This adapter allowed a wide range of OM lenses to be used with the new Olympus DSLRs. The adapter is no longer given away for free, but is still available for purchase from authorised Olympus resellers.

	2003	2004	2005	2006	2007	2008	2009	2010	2011	2012	2013
Flagship		E-1				E-3			E-5		
High-end							E-30				
Midrange							E-620				
Midrange								E-600			
Midrange				E-500	E-510		E-520				
Entry-level			E-300	E-330			E-450				
Entry-level				E-400	E-410		E-420				
