= Dust reduction system =

Digital camera feature

A dust spot caused by a dust particle on the image sensor

A dust reduction system, or dust removal system, is used in several makes of digital cameras to remove dust from the image sensor. Every time lenses are changed, dust may enter the camera body and settle on the image sensor.

Digital single-lens reflex cameras (DSLR) are particularly vulnerable to this issue, since the interior of the camera is exposed during lens changes unlike other forms of digital cameras, and the image sensor is fixed, unlike a film camera. Even the tiniest (micrometre-size) dust particles or other contaminants that settle on the face of the image sensor (individual pixels of which have dimensions on the order of ~5 micrometres) may cast shadows and thus become visible in the final image as more or less diffuse grey blobs, depending on aperture.

Dust may be generated by internal moving parts or may be moved by air currents within the camera. Some systems remove or clean the sensor by vibrating at a very high frequency—between 100 hertz and 50 kilohertz.

== Types of systems ==
Different manufactures employ their own version of dust abatement. One type uses a piezo crystal to vibrate a filter which covers the sensor. The second type moves the actual sensor—this may be supplemented by a controlled flow of air.

=== Piezo crystal ultrasonic vibration of filter ===
This system vibrates the thin filter surface that covers the image sensor many tens of thousands of times per second (35,000 to 50,000 hertz) to remove particles from the filter. The system consists of a very thin piece of filter glass placed in front of the image sensor; the area between the filter and the sensor is sealed, so no dust can enter. Whenever the camera is turned on, a piezoelectric driver induces a vibration in the filter glass, shaking dust off. A piece of adhesive located inside the camera traps removed dust.

The distance between the filter glass and the sensor also mitigates the problem of dust, since any dust that does adhere to the glass will be held further away from the sensor, and thus produce a larger, more diffuse, and less noticeable shadow. In practice, few Four Thirds system users report having any issues with sensor dust.

Olympus invented the system, called a Supersonic Wave Filter (SSWF), and licensed it to Leica and Panasonic. Canon also uses this type of system. Nikon uses a similar system, and they refer to it as high resonance.

The SSWF has been included in all Olympus, Panasonic, and Leica Four Thirds DSLRs, and is often cited as a key advantage of the system by reviewers and users. One disadvantage to the implementation on all current Four Thirds cameras is that the SSWF is triggered whenever the camera is turned on, causing a delay of about 0.8 seconds before the camera is ready to shoot.

=== Sensor shifting ===
This type of system moves the actual sensor to help reduce dust. It vibrates the actual sensor at around 100 Hz. The amount of movement or sensor travel is larger than the higher-frequency filter vibrating types. A crude analogy to compare it to the piezo crystal filter method is something like hitting or banging the sensor to displace the contaminant, whereas the piezo vibrates a filter to make the particles fall off. The sensor may also utilize a negatively charged surface coating to reduce static and help repel negatively charged particles. Konica Minolta is credited with being the original developer of this type of system. Sony and Pentax incorporate sensor shifting in their cameras with dust reduction systems.

== Need for use with digital cameras ==
These problems are not as critical with film SLRs as the dust disappears as the film is wound on, but with DSLRs the image sensor always remains in the same place. Even with dust particles smaller than 1 micrometre (0.001 mm) and invisible to the human eye, once they land on the image sensor's surface they can degrade the quality of all the images taken thereafter. Furthermore, it can be a difficult task to remove the dust, sometimes making it necessary to send the camera in for servicing.

== Types of dust particles ==
There are two main types of dust that can potentially degrade image quality: Dust particles that adhere through electric force and dust particles that adhere through intermolecular force.

=== Dust particles adhering through electrostatic charges ===
Most of the contamination to be found on the image sensor surface is caused by dust particles as small as just one micrometre (0.001 mm) adhering to it through electrical charges. The particles themselves carry a positive static electric charge, while the image sensor is negatively charged, which makes them attract each other. The same phenomenon can be observed on the surface of LCD and CRT monitor screens.

=== Dust particles adhering through intermolecular force ===
The intermolecular force is weaker than electrostatic charges. However, it still attracts microscopic-sized dust to the image sensor with infinitesimal force. While earthing (grounding) the camera can help reduce the problem of electrostatic dust it does not reduce intermolecular attraction. If, for example, flour were drizzled into the camera, it would still adhere to the surface of earthed metal. This kind of dust is attracted by intermolecular force. Liquid also adheres to the image sensor by intermolecular force and such molecules adhere strongly due to their ability to get closer to the adhesion surface, making it harder for dust reduction systems to remove these type of contaminants completely. In such instances, wiping the optical elements in front of the image sensor with cleaning fluid may be necessary.

== History of dust reduction systems ==
Olympus was the first to include a dust reduction system on a DSLR, featuring their "Supersonic Wave Filter" (SSWF) dust reduction technology on the Olympus E-1 in 2003. All Olympus DSLRs with removable lenses have included this system, as have Panasonic's and Leica's DSLRs; both companies use Olympus technology. Olympus Corporation was awarded an innovation prize by the Japan Institute of Invention and Innovation (JIII) in 2010 for its invention of automatic dust reduction for digital cameras.

Before that Sigma was sealing the mirror box of their cameras with a protective filter behind the lens mount, preventing dust from entering the camera body.

Other manufacturers, namely Sony (2006), Canon (2006), Pentax (2006), and Nikon (2007), followed suit with their own dust removal technologies. Each manufacturer uses a somewhat different system.

There have been several attempts by camera magazines to test the various dust reduction systems to see how effective they are. Pixinfo, Chasseur d’Images, and Camera Labs have all published their opinions, which can be summarized as saying that none of the systems are completely effective, but that the Olympus SSWF system is significantly better than most of the others, with the Nikon system perhaps a close second.

== See also ==
- Ultrasonic cleaning
- Resonance
- Low-pass filter
