= List of Micro Four Thirds lenses =

The Micro Four Thirds system (MFT) of still and video cameras and lenses was released by Olympus and Panasonic in 2008; lenses built for MFT use a flange focal distance of 19.25 mm, covering an image sensor with dimensions 17.3 × 13.0 mm (21.6 mm diagonal). MFT lenses have been produced by many companies under several different brands, including Cosina Voigtländer, DJI, Kowa, Kodak, Laowa (Venus Optics), Lensbaby, Mitakon, Olympus, Panasonic, Samyang, Sharp, Sigma, SLR Magic, Tamron, Tokina, TTArtisan, Veydra, Xiaomi, Yongnuo, Zonlai, and 7artisans.

== Autofocus zoom lenses ==
=== Wide zoom lenses ===
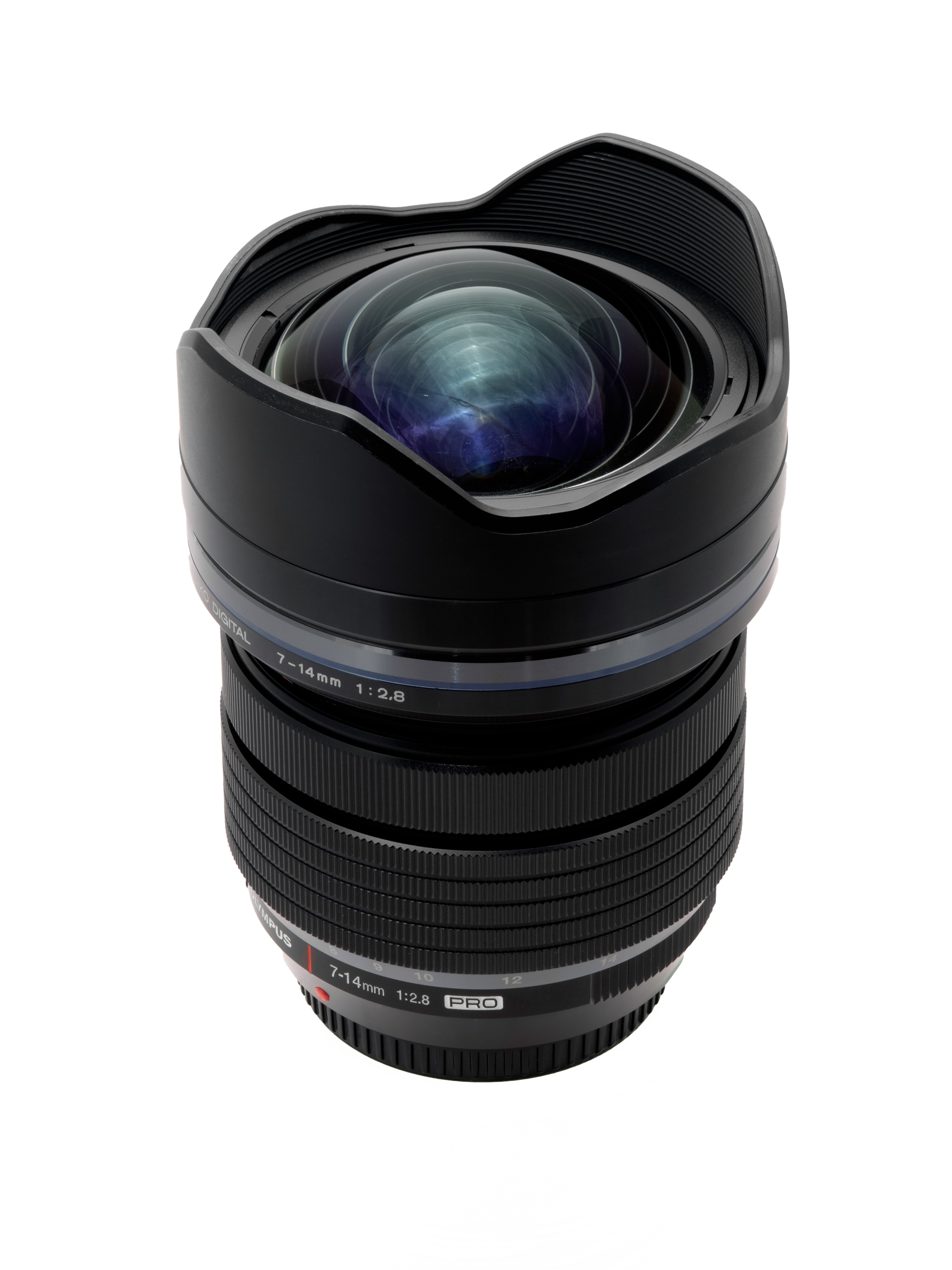
Olympus M.Zuiko Digital ED 7-14 mm f/2.8 Pro

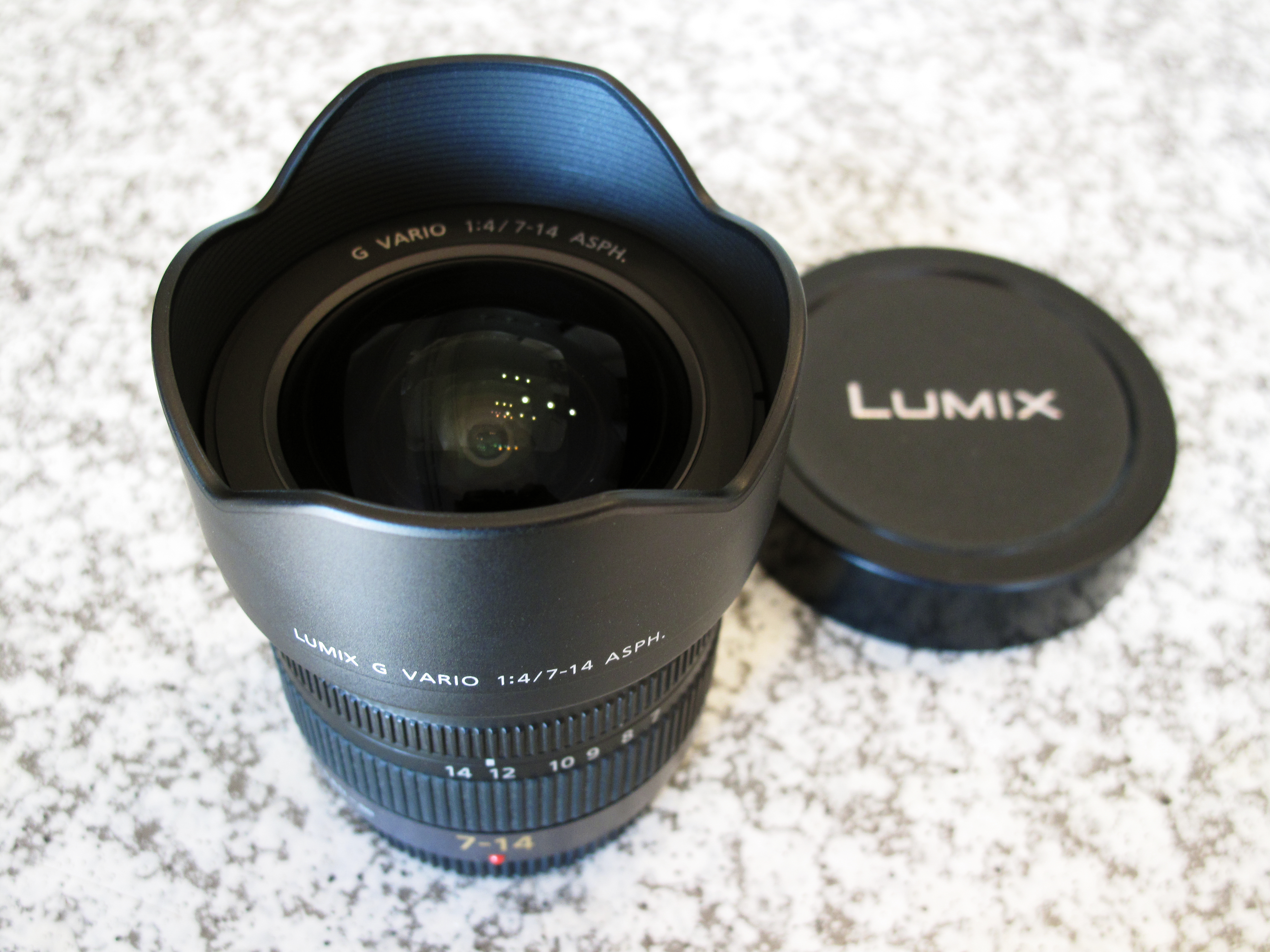
Panasonic Lumix G Vario 7-14 mm f/4 Asph.

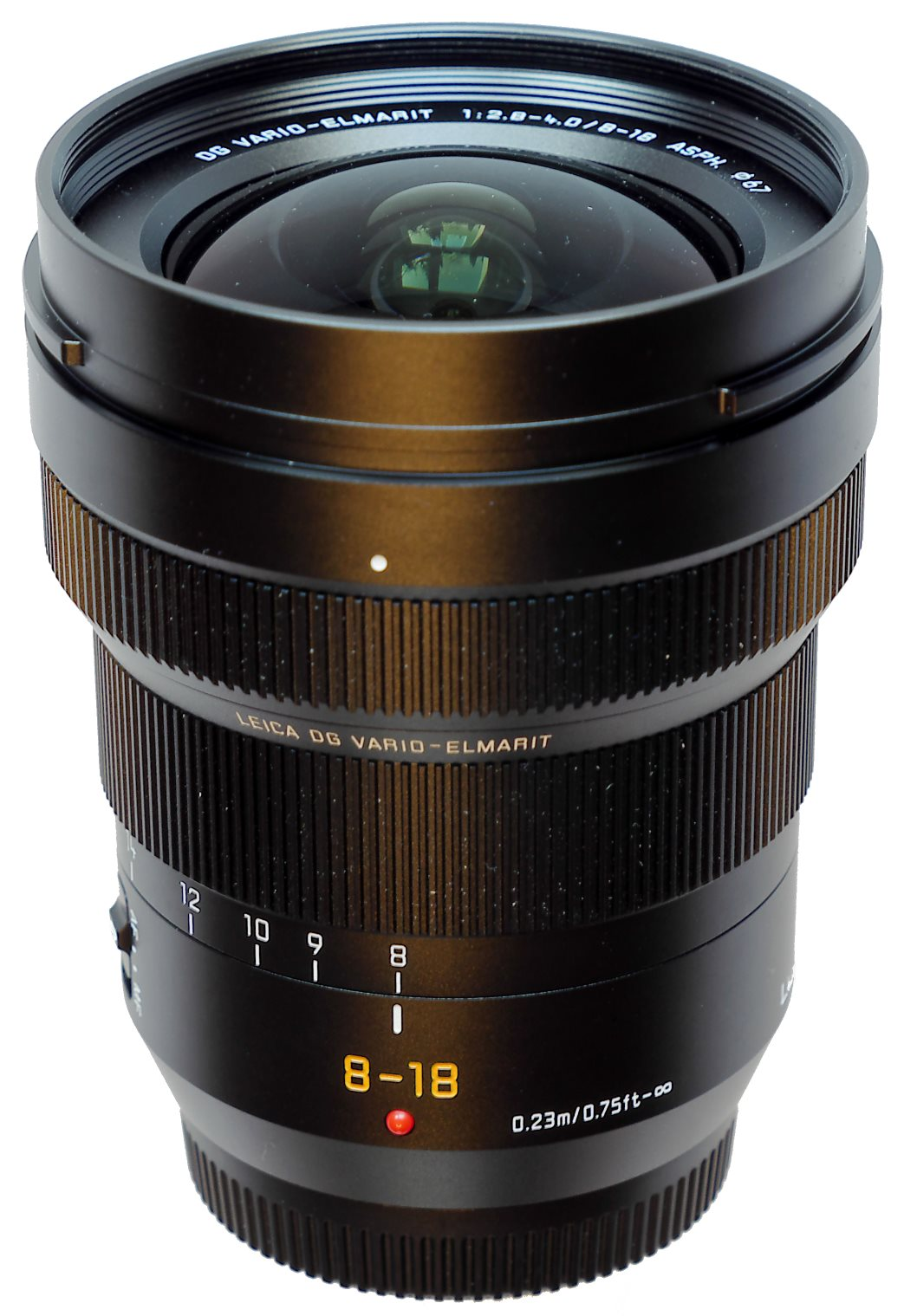
Panasonic Leica DG Vario-Elmar 8-18 mm f/2.8-4 Asph.

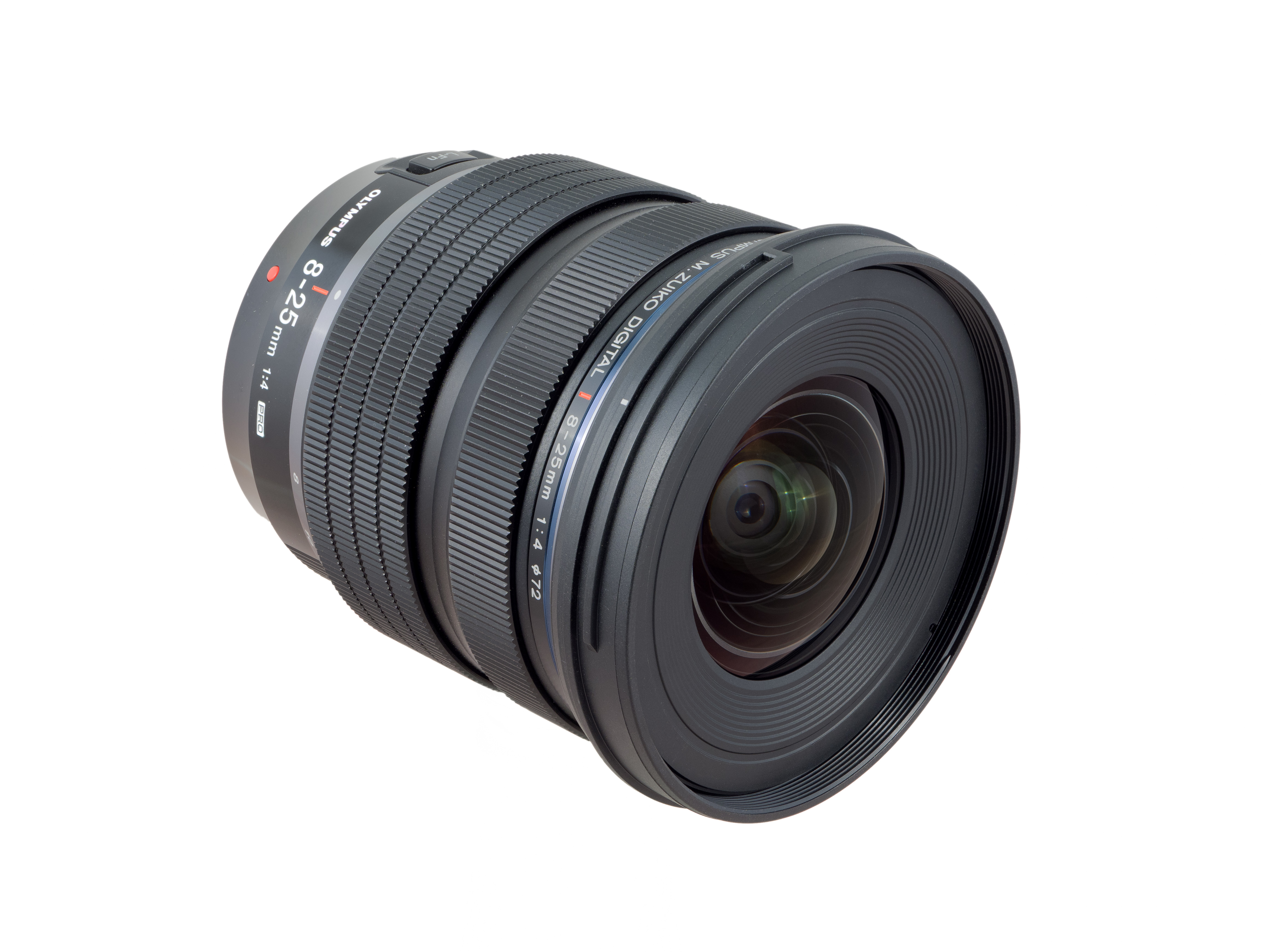
Olympus M.Zuiko Digital ED 8-25mm f/4 PRO

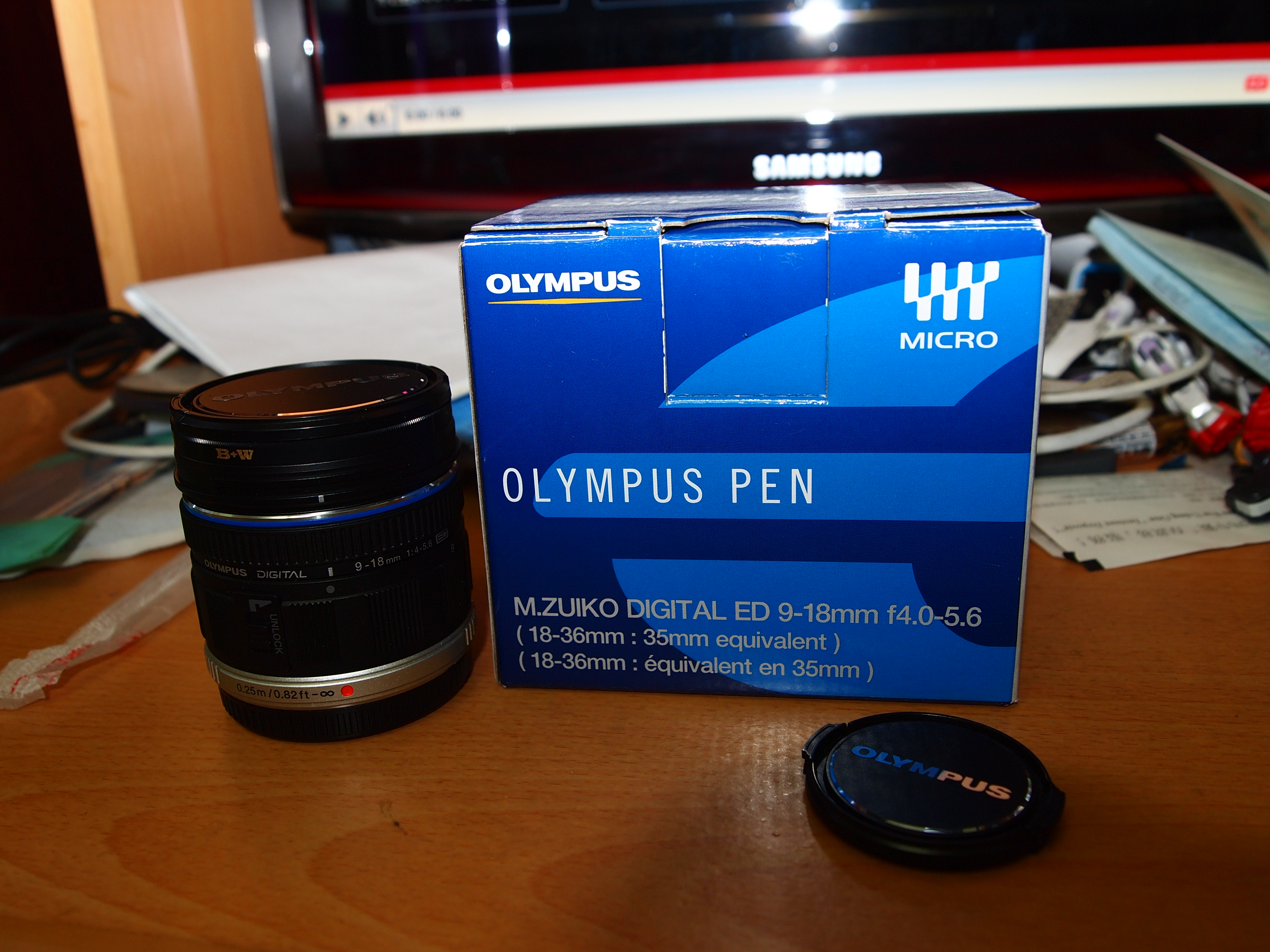
Olympus M.Zuiko Digital ED 9-18 mm f/4-5.6

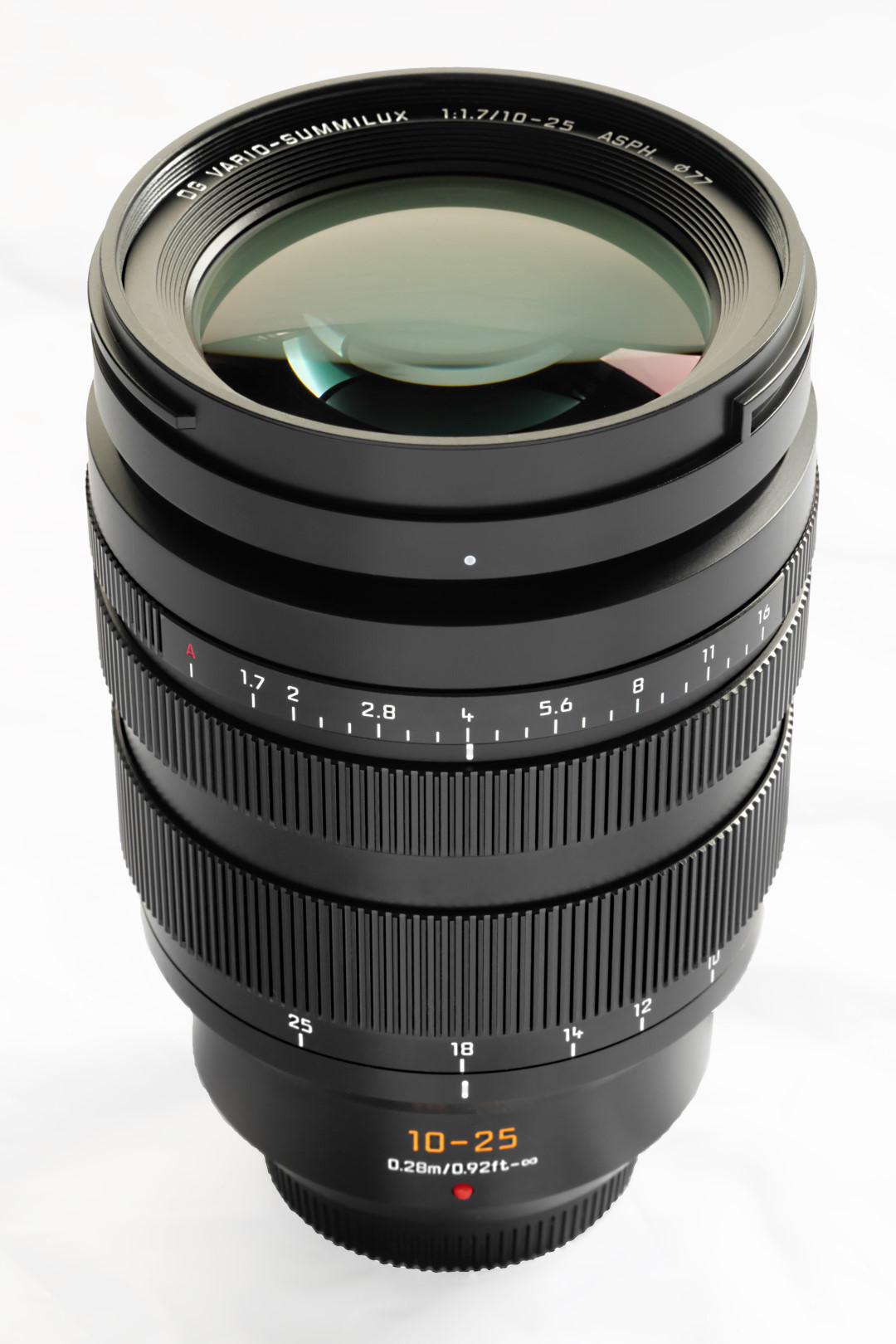
Panasonic Leica DG Vario-Summilux 10-25 f/1.7 Asph.

| Brand | Product Name | Focal length | 35mm equiv. | Max. Aperture | Filter (mm) | Dims. (Φ×L) | Weight | Constr. | Min. focus (mag.) | Remarks |
|---|---|---|---|---|---|---|---|---|---|---|
| Olympus | Olympus M.Zuiko Digital ED 7-14 mm f/2.8 PRO | 7-14 mm | 14-28 mm | f/2.8 | —N/a | 77 mm × 88.5 mm (3.03 in × 3.48 in) | 535 g (18.9 oz) | 14e/11g | 0.2 m (7.9 in) (0.12×) | weather-sealed |
| Panasonic | Panasonic Lumix G Vario 7-14 mm f/4 Asph. | 7-14 mm | 14-28 mm | f/4 | —N/a | 70 mm × 83.1 mm (2.76 in × 3.27 in) | 300 g (11 oz) | 16e/12g | 0.25 m (9.8 in) (0.08×) | |
| Panasonic | Panasonic Leica DG Vario-Elmar 8-18 mm f/2.8-4 Asph. | 8-18 mm | 16-36 mm | f/2.8-4 | 67 | 73.4 mm × 88 mm (2.89 in × 3.46 in) | 315 g (11.1 oz) | 15e/10g | 0.23 m (9.1 in) (0.12×) | Splash / Dust / Freezeproof. Announced April 2017 |
| Olympus | Olympus M.Zuiko Digital ED 8-25mm f/4 PRO | 8-25mm | 16-50mm | f/4 | 72 | 70 mm × 83.1 mm (2.76 in × 3.27 in) | 411 g (14.5 oz) | 16e/10g | 0.23 m (9.1 in) (0.21×) | weather-sealed, announced June 2021 |
| Olympus | Olympus M.Zuiko Digital ED 9-18mm f/4-5.6 | 9-18mm | 18-36mm | f/4.0-5.6 | 52 | 56.5 mm × 49.5 mm (2.22 in × 1.95 in) | 155 g (5.5 oz) | 12e/8g | 0.25 m (9.8 in) (0.10×) | |
| Panasonic | Panasonic Leica DG Vario-Summilux 10-25mm f/1.7 Asph. | 10-25mm | 20-50mm | f/1.7 | 77 | 87.6 mm × 128 mm (3.45 in × 5.04 in) | 690 g (24 oz) | 17e/12g | 0.28 m (11 in) (0.14×) | Splash / Dust / Freezeproof. Announced May 2019 |

=== Standard zoom lenses ===
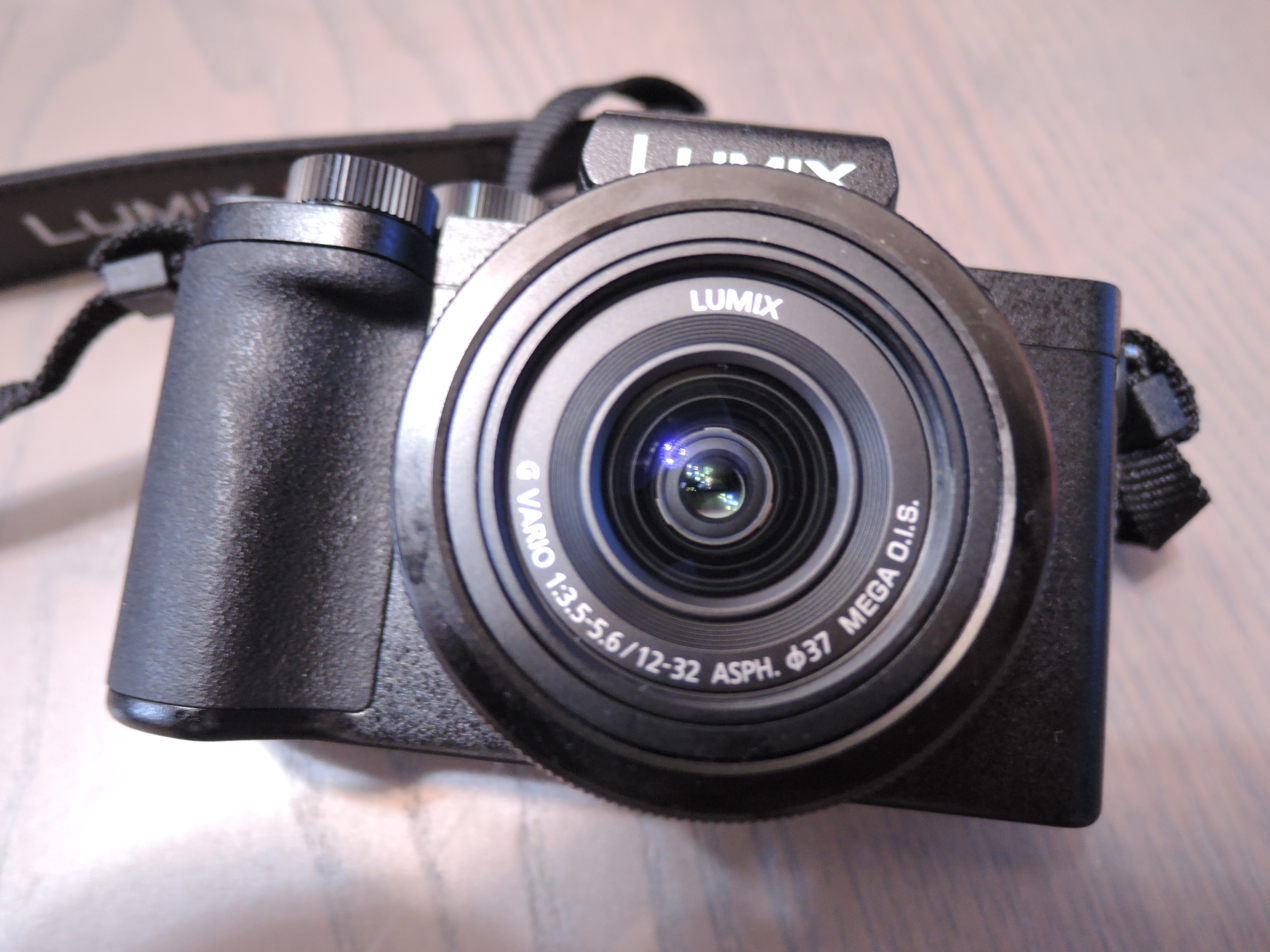
Panasonic Lumix G Vario 12-32mm f/3.5-5.6 Asph., Mega O.I.S.

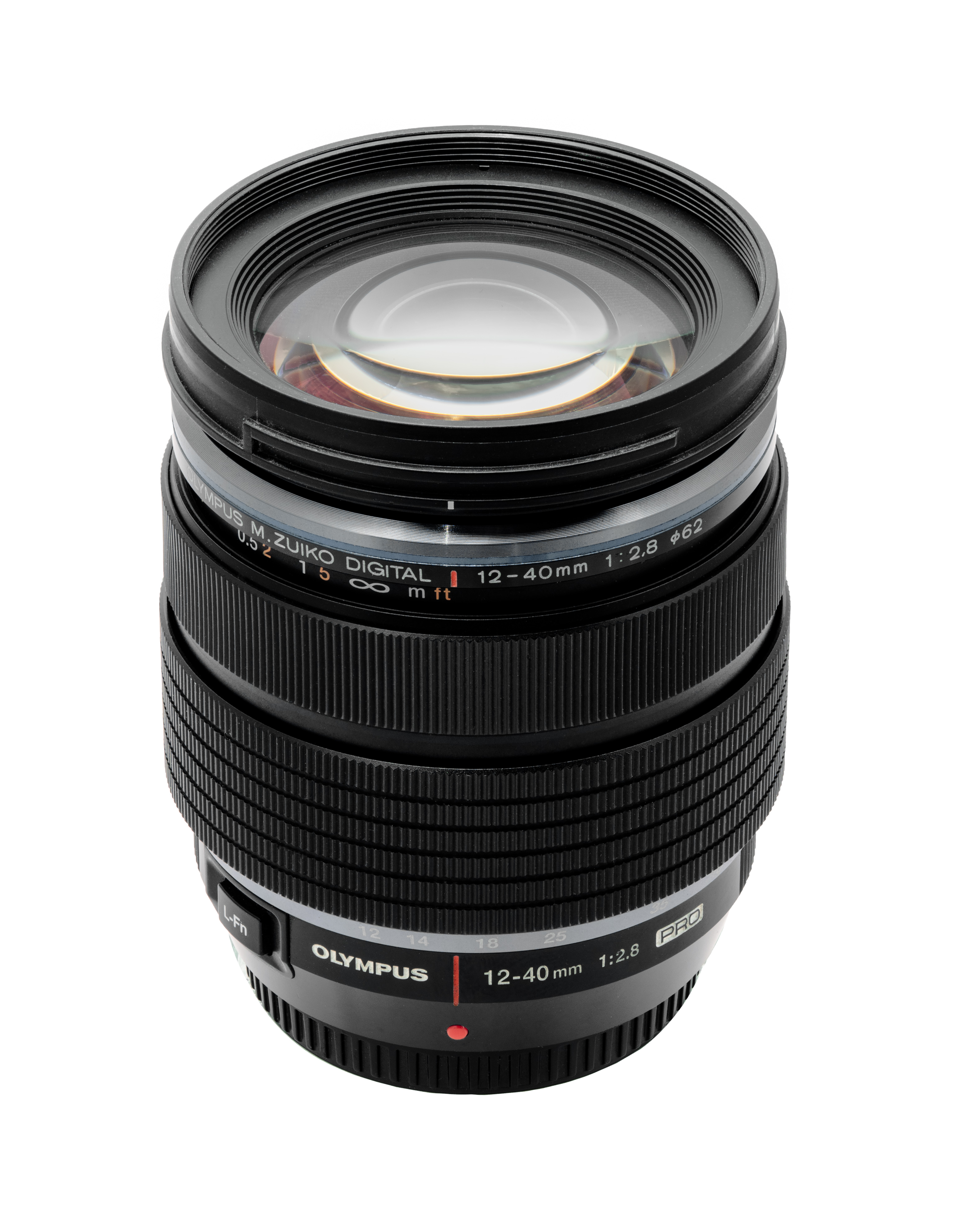
Olympus M.Zuiko Digital ED 12-40mm f/2.8 PRO

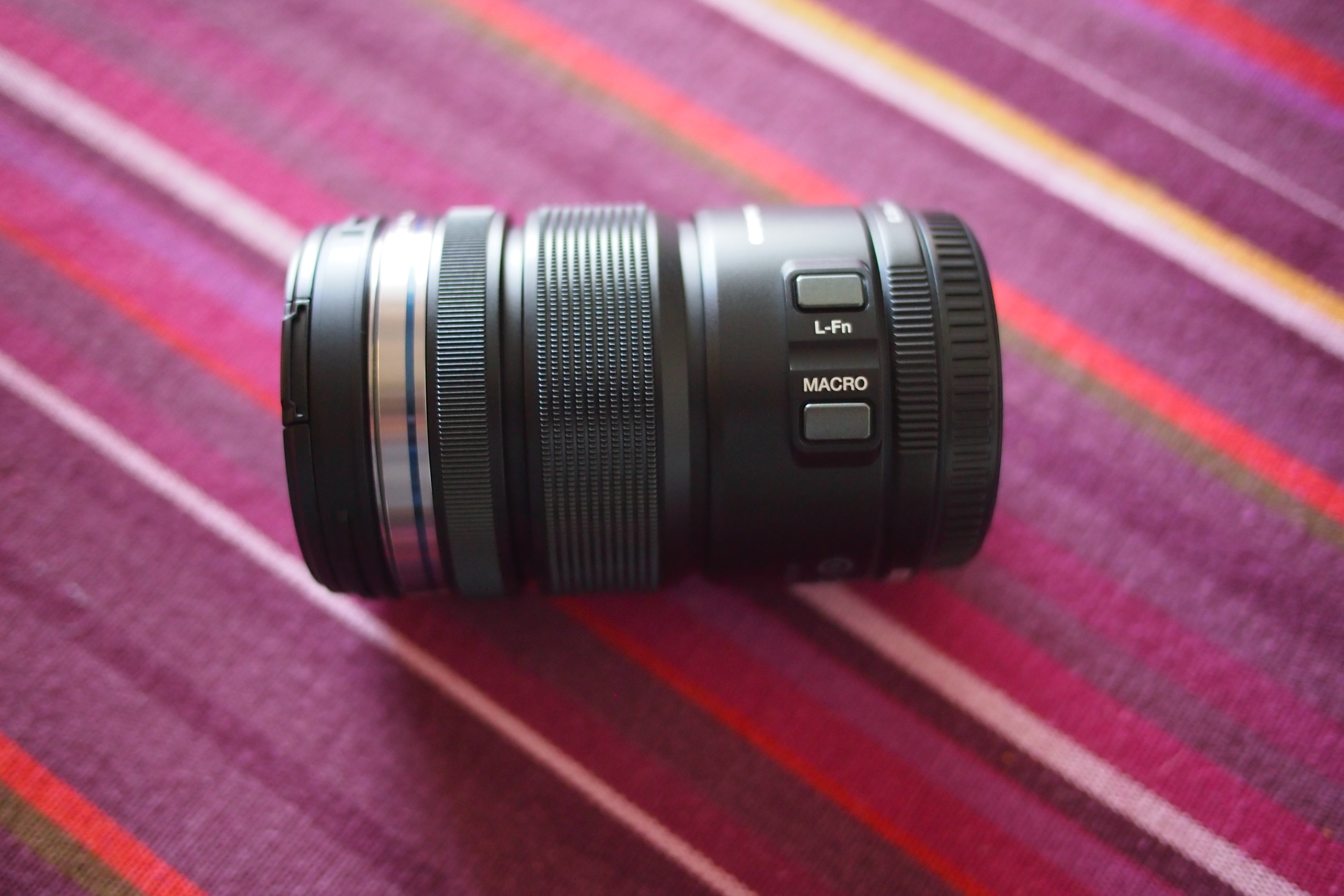
Olympus M.Zuiko Digital ED 12-50mm f/3.5-6.3 EZ

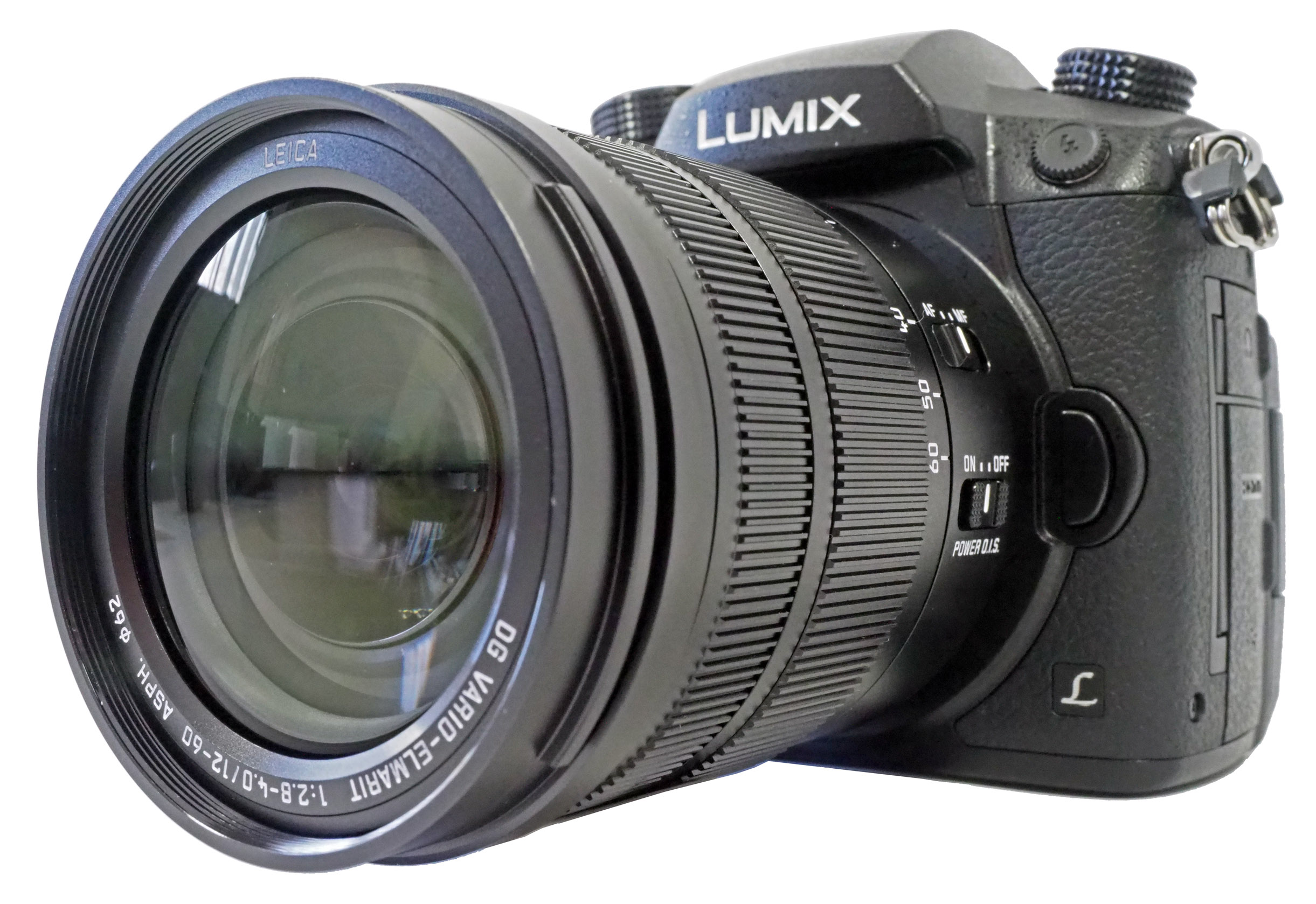
Panasonic Leica DG Vario-Elmarit 12-60mm f/2.8-4 Asph., Power O.I.S.

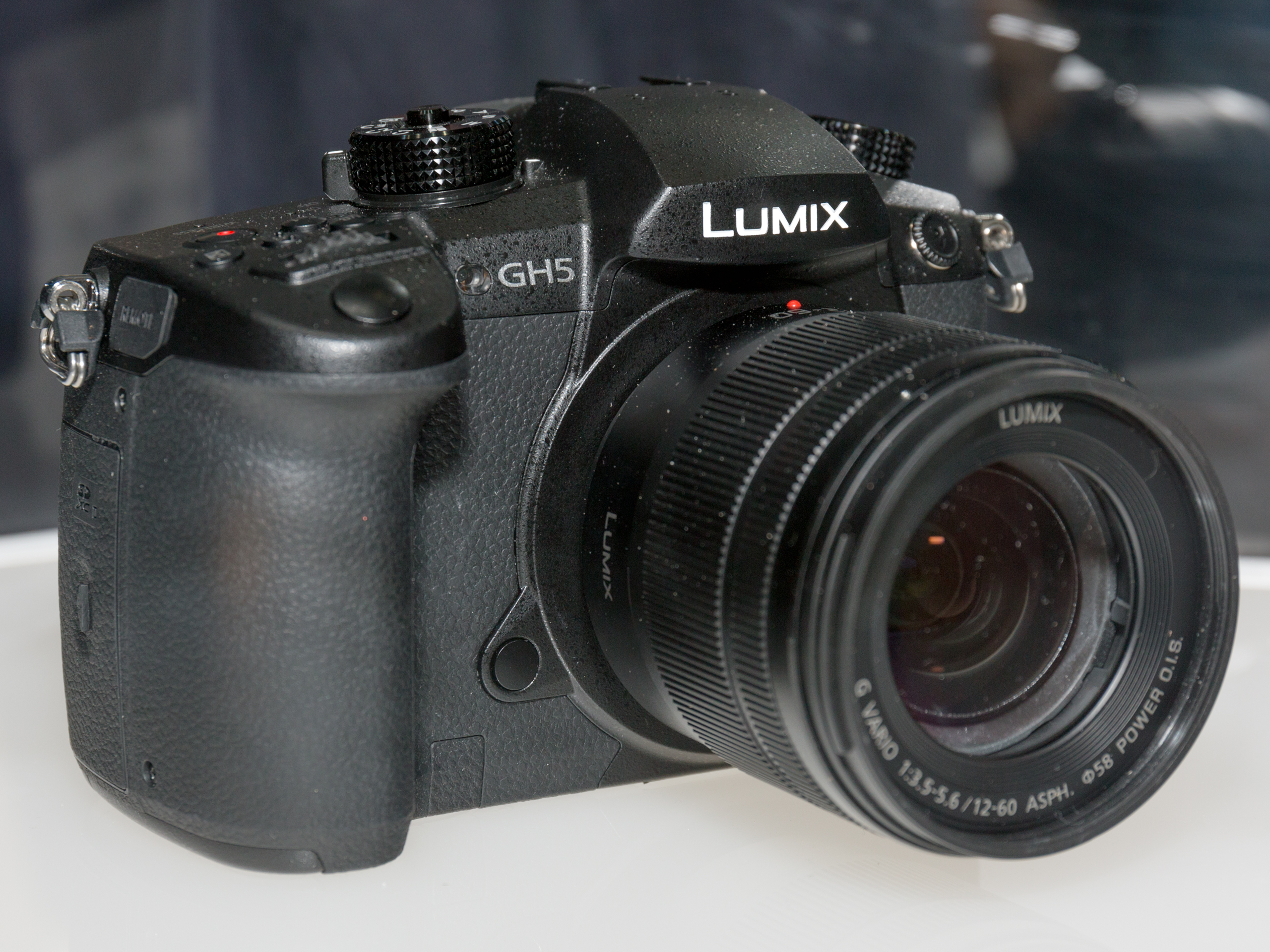
Panasonic Lumix G Vario 12-60mm f/3.5-5.6 Asph., Power O.I.S.

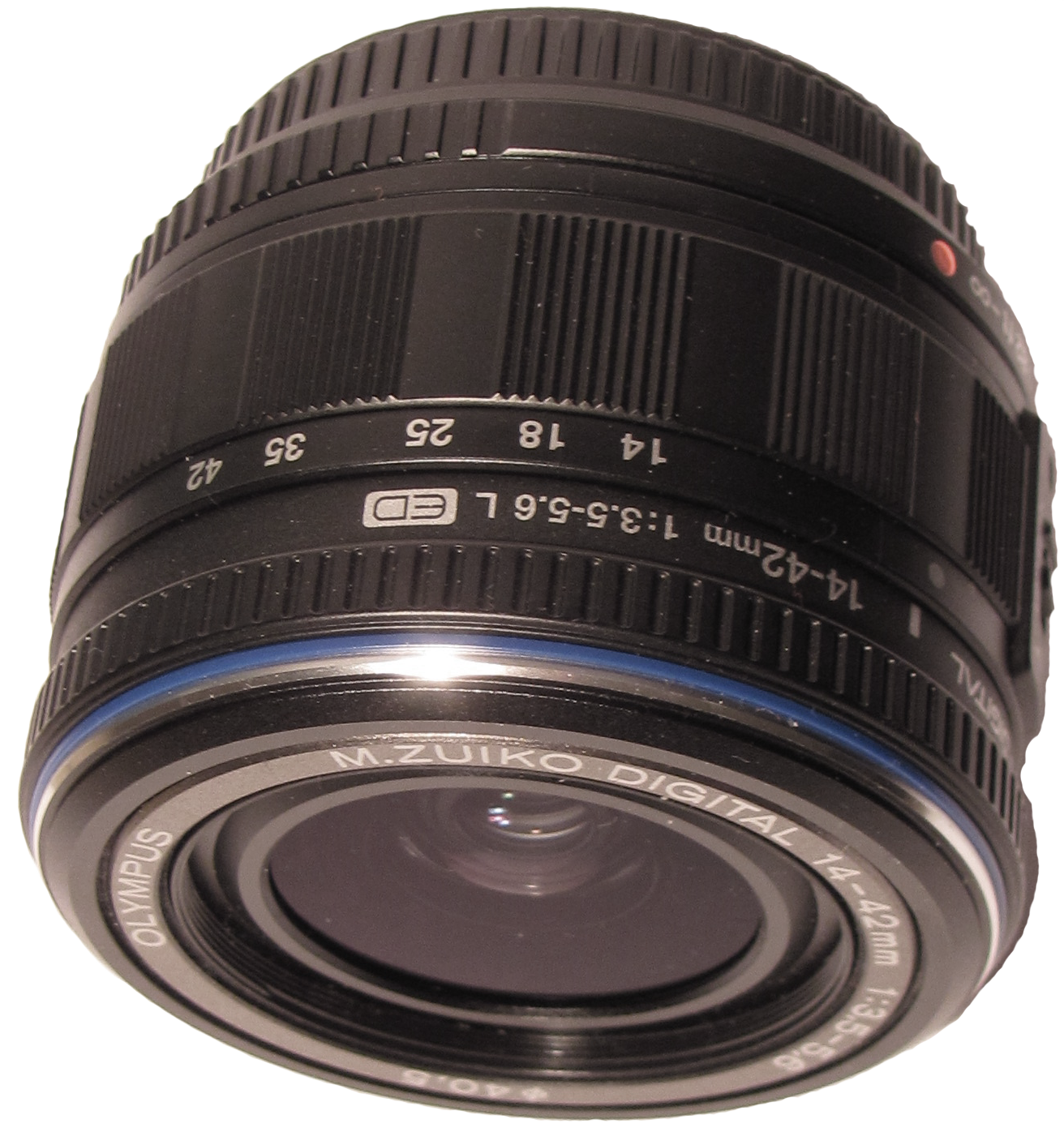
Olympus M.Zuiko Digital ED 14-42mm f/3.5-5.6

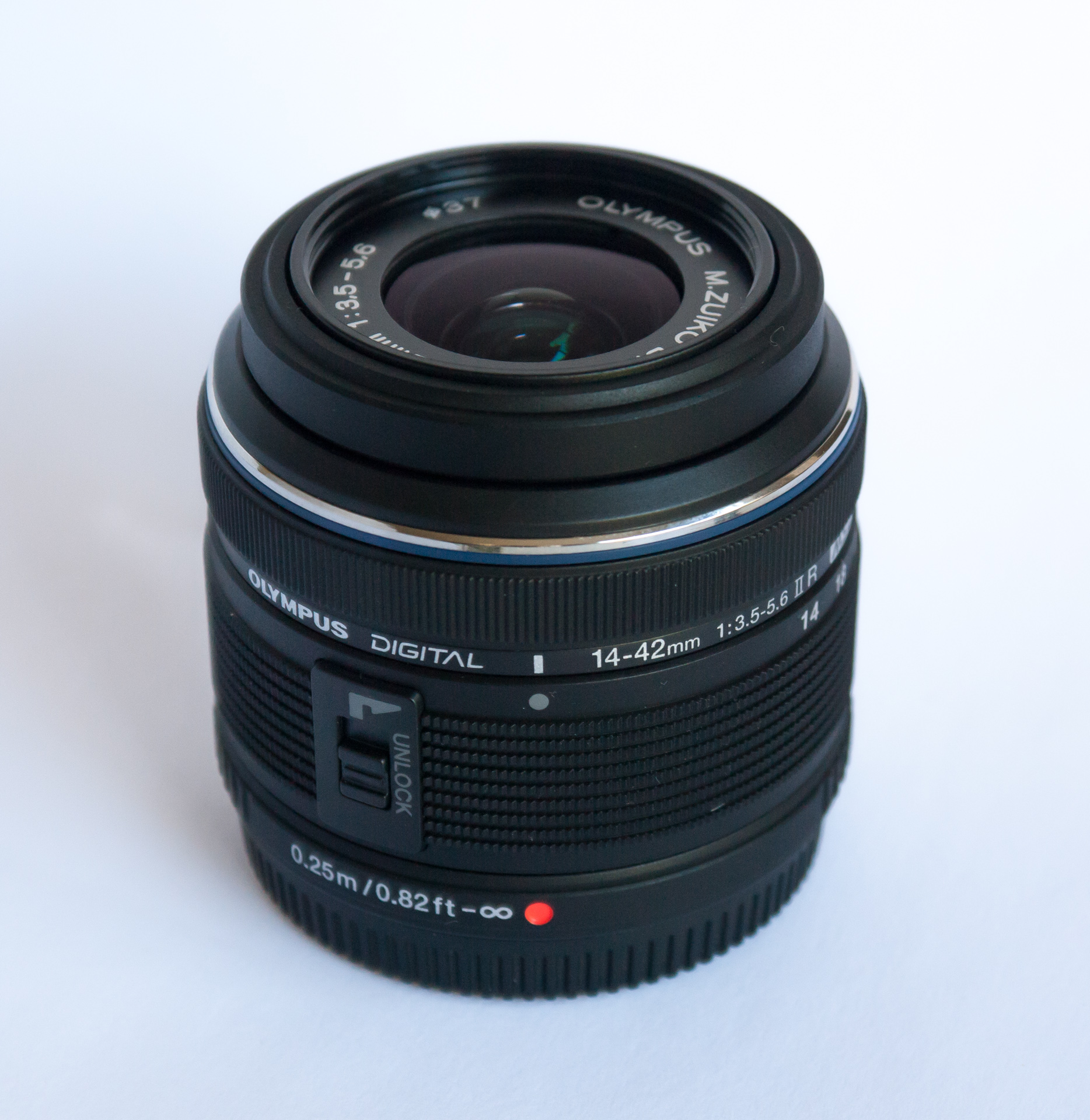
Olympus M.Zuiko Digital 14-42mm f/3.5-5.6 II

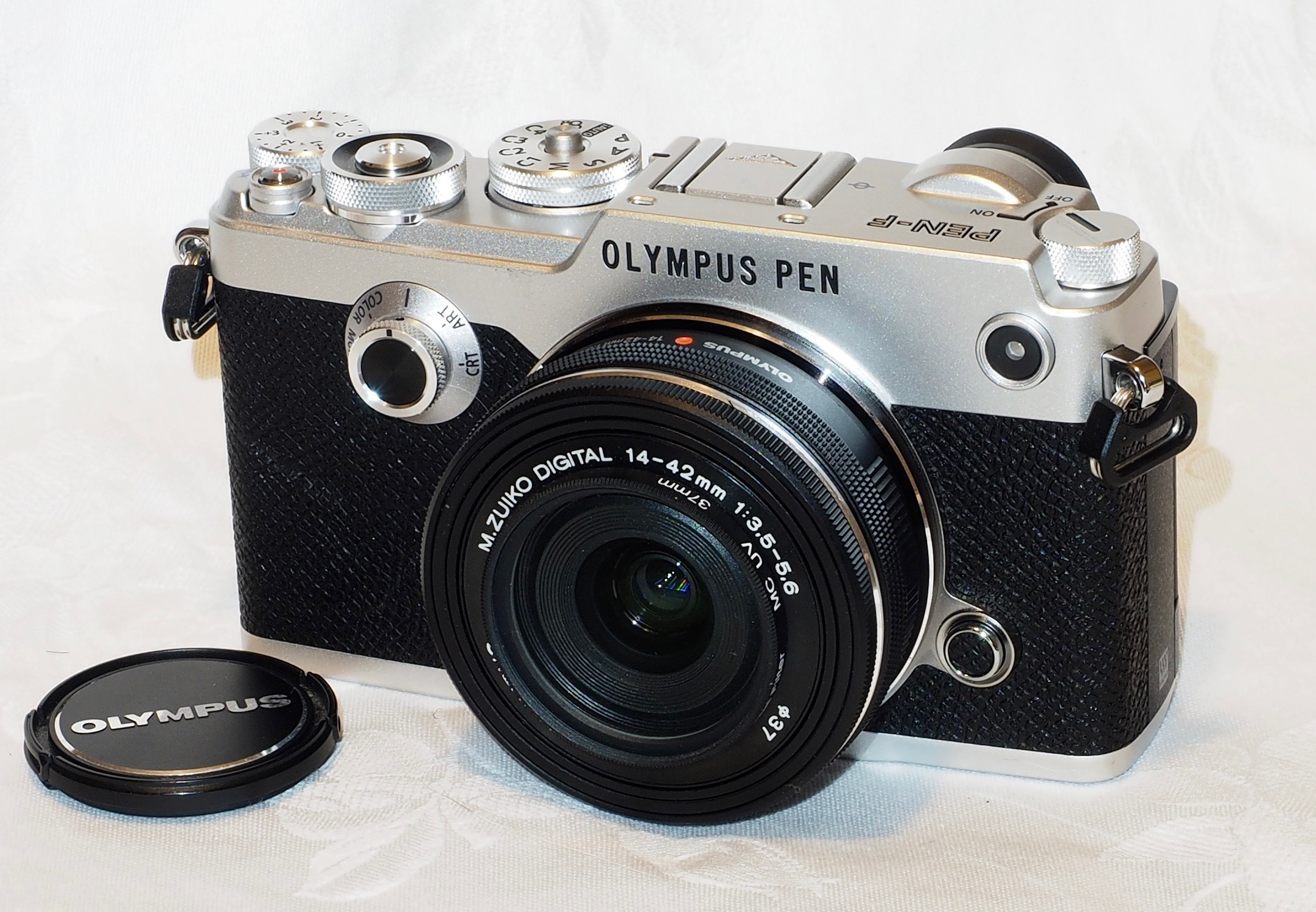
Olympus M.Zuiko Digital ED 14-42mm f/3.5-5.6 EZ

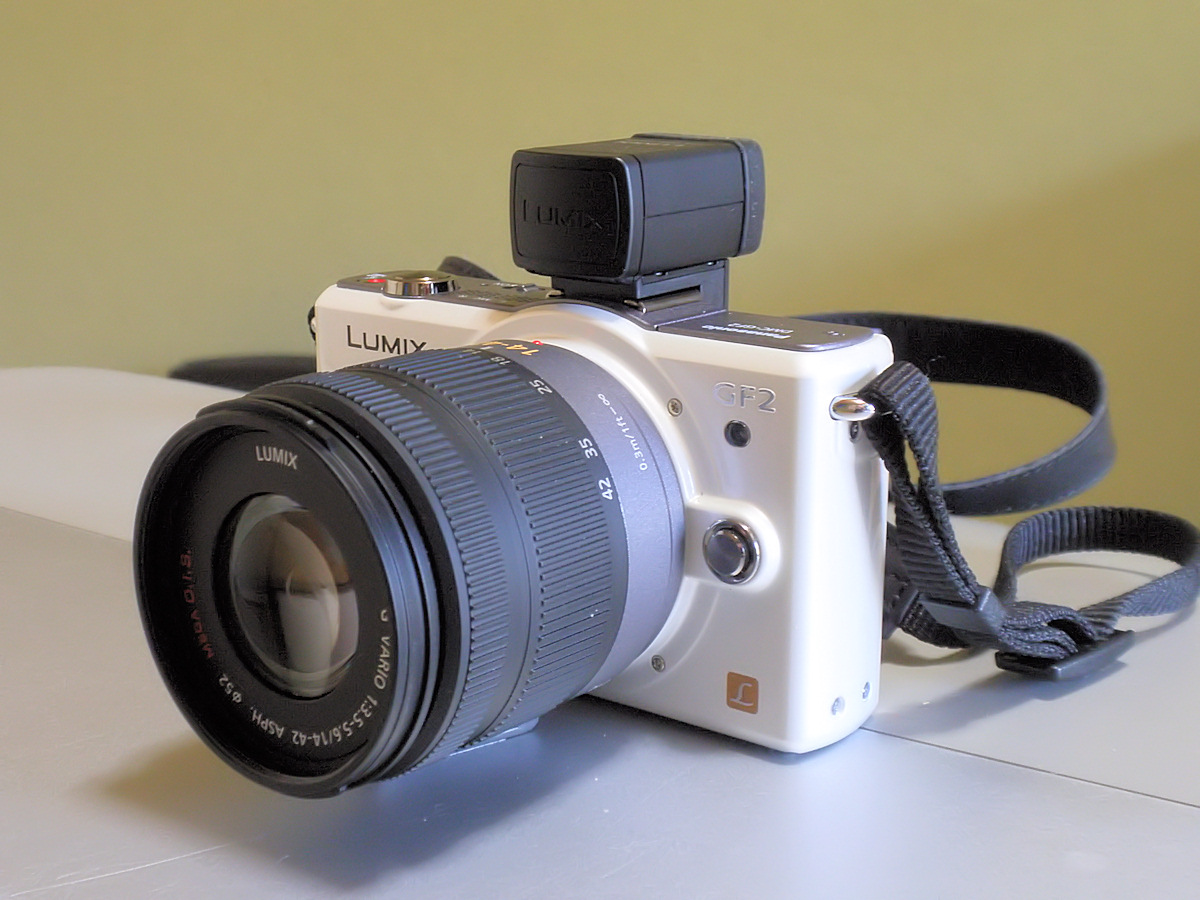
Panasonic Lumix G Vario 14-42mm f/3.5-5.6 Asph., Mega O.I.S.

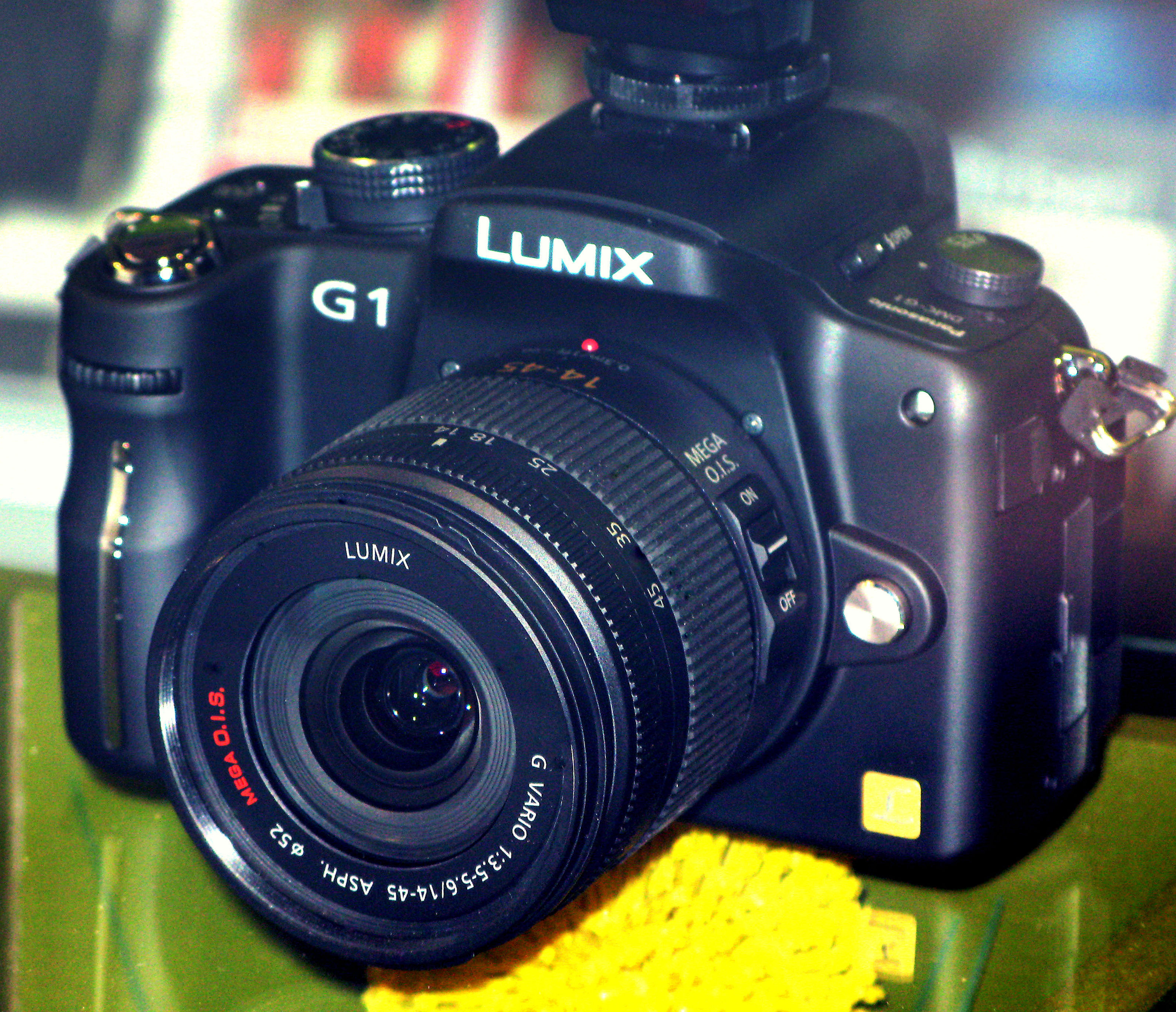
Panasonic Lumix G Vario 14-45mm f/3.5-5.6 Asph., Mega O.I.S.

| Brand | Product Name | Focal length | 35mm equiv. | Max. Aperture | Filter (mm) | Dims. (Φ×L) | Weight | Constr. | Min. focus (mag.) | Remarks |
|---|---|---|---|---|---|---|---|---|---|---|
| Panasonic | Panasonic Lumix G Vario 12-32mm f/3.5-5.6 Asph., Mega O.I.S. | 12-32mm | 24-64mm | f/3.5-5.6 | 37 | 55.5 mm × 24 mm (2.19 in × 0.94 in) | 70 g (2.5 oz) | 8e/7g | 0.20–0.30 m (7.9–11.8 in) (0.13×) | announced October 2013 |
| Panasonic | Panasonic Lumix G X Vario 12-35mm f/2.8 Asph., Power O.I.S. | 12-35mm | 24-70mm | f/2.8 | 58 | 67.6 mm × 73.8 mm (2.66 in × 2.91 in) | 305 g (10.8 oz) | 14e/9g | 0.25 m (9.8 in) (0.17×) | discontinued, announced in 2012 |
| Panasonic | Panasonic Lumix G X Vario 12-35mm f/2.8 II Asph., Power O.I.S. | 12-35mm | 24-70mm | f/2.8 | 58 | 67.6 mm × 73.8 mm (2.66 in × 2.91 in) | 305 g (10.8 oz) | 14e/9g | 0.25 m (9.8 in) (0.17×) | announced at CES in 2017 |
| Panasonic | Panasonic Leica DG Vario-Elmarit 12-35mm F2.8 | 12-35mm | 24-70mm | f/2.8 | 58 | 67.6 mm × 73.8 mm (2.66 in × 2.91 in) | 306 g (10.8 oz) | 14e/9g | 0.15–0.25 m (5.9–9.8 in) (0.21×) | announced December 2022 |
| YONGNUO | YONGNUO YN12-35mm F2.8-4M | 12-35mm | 24-70mm | f/2.8-4.0 | 67 | 72 mm × 94 mm (2.8 in × 3.7 in) | 318 g (11.2 oz) | 14e/11g | 0.25 m (9.8 in) (0.1×) | |
| Olympus | Olympus M.Zuiko Digital ED 12-40mm f/2.8 PRO | 12-40mm | 24-80mm | f/2.8 | 62 | 69.9 mm × 84 mm (2.75 in × 3.31 in) | 382 g (13.5 oz) | 14e/9g | 0.2 m (7.9 in) (0.3×) | weather-sealed, announced September 2013 |
| OM System | OM System M.Zuiko Digital ED 12-40mm f/2.8 PRO II | 12-40mm | 24-80mm | f/2.8 | 62 | 69.9 mm × 84 mm (2.75 in × 3.31 in) | 382 g (13.5 oz) | 14e/9g | 0.2 m (7.9 in) (0.3×) | IP53 weather-sealed, announced February 2022 |
| YI | YI Xiaoyi 12-40mm f/3.5-5.6 | 12-40mm | 24-80mm | f/3.5-5.6 | 49 | 58.3 mm × 63 mm (2.30 in × 2.48 in) | ? | 11e/9g | 0.35 m (14 in) | |
| Olympus | Olympus M.Zuiko Digital ED 12-45mm f/4 PRO | 12-45mm | 24-90mm | f/4 | 58 | 63.4 mm × 70.0 mm (2.50 in × 2.76 in) | 254 g (9.0 oz) | 12e/9g | 0.12–0.23 m (4.7–9.1 in) (0.25×) | weather-sealed, announced February 2020 |
| Kodak | Kodak PixPro 12-45mm f/3.5-6.3 Aspheric ED | 12-45mm | 24-90mm | f/3.5-6.3 | 49 | 58.1 mm × 63 mm (2.29 in × 2.48 in) | 182.5 g (6.44 oz) | 11e/9g | 0.35 m (14 in) (0.045×) | |
| Olympus | Olympus M.Zuiko Digital ED 12-50mm f/3.5-6.3 EZ | 12-50mm | 24-100mm | f/3.5-6.3 | 52 | 57 mm × 83 mm (2.2 in × 3.3 in) | 211 g (7.4 oz) | 10e/9g | 0.2–0.35 m (7.9–13.8 in) (0.36×) | weather-sealed |
| Panasonic | Panasonic Leica DG Vario-Elmarit 12-60mm f/2.8-4 Asph., Power O.I.S. | 12-60mm | 24-120mm | f/2.8-4 | 62 | 68.4 mm × 86 mm (2.69 in × 3.39 in) | 320 g (11 oz) | 14e/12g | 0.20 m (7.9 in) (0.3×) | weather-sealed, announced 4 January 2017 |
| Panasonic | Panasonic Lumix G Vario 12-60mm f/3.5-5.6 Asph., Power O.I.S. | 12-60mm | 24-120mm | f/3.5-5.6 | 58 | 66 mm × 71 mm (2.6 in × 2.8 in) | 210 g (7.4 oz) | 11e/9g | 0.20–0.25 m (7.9–9.8 in) (0.27×) | weather-sealed, announced 24 February 2016 |
| Olympus | Olympus M.Zuiko Digital ED 14-42mm f/3.5-5.6 | 14-42mm | 28-84mm | f/3.5-5.6 | 40.5 | 62 mm × 43.5 mm (2.44 in × 1.71 in) | 150 g (5.3 oz) | 9e/8g | 0.25 m (9.8 in) (0.24×) | discontinued |
| Olympus | Olympus M.Zuiko Digital ED 14-42mm f/3.5-5.6 L | 14-42mm | 28-84mm | f/3.5-5.6 | 40.5 | 62 mm × 43.5 mm (2.44 in × 1.71 in) | 133 g (4.7 oz) | 9e/8g | 0.25 m (9.8 in) (0.24×) | discontinued, lightweight version |
| Olympus | Olympus M.Zuiko Digital 14-42mm f/3.5-5.6 II MSC | 14-42mm | 28-84mm | f/3.5-5.6 | 37 | 56.5 mm × 50 mm (2.22 in × 1.97 in) | 112 g (4.0 oz) | 8e/7g | 0.25–0.3 m (9.8–11.8 in) (0.19×) | discontinued |
| Olympus | Olympus M.Zuiko Digital 14-42mm f/3.5-5.6 IIR MSC | 14-42mm | 28-84mm | f/3.5-5.6 | 37 | 56.5 mm × 50 mm (2.22 in × 1.97 in) | 113 g (4.0 oz) | 8e/7g | 0.25–0.3 m (9.8–11.8 in) (0.19×) | |
| Olympus | Olympus M.Zuiko Digital ED 14-42mm f/3.5-5.6 EZ | 14-42mm | 28-84mm | f/3.5-5.6 | 37 | 60.6 mm × 22.5 mm (2.39 in × 0.89 in) | 95 g (3.4 oz) | 8e/7g | 0.2–0.29 m (7.9–11.4 in) (0.225×) | announced January 2014 |
| Panasonic | Panasonic Lumix G Vario 14-42mm f/3.5-5.6 Asph., Mega O.I.S. | 14-42mm | 28-84mm | f/3.5-5.6 | 52 | 60.6 mm × 63.6 mm (2.39 in × 2.50 in) | 165 g (5.8 oz) | 12e/9g | 0.3 m (12 in) (0.16×) | |
| Panasonic | Panasonic Lumix G Vario 14-42mm f/3.5-5.6 II Asph., Mega O.I.S. | 14-42mm | 28-84mm | f/3.5-5.6 | 46 | 56 mm × 49 mm (2.2 in × 1.9 in) | 110 g (3.9 oz) | 9e/8g | 0.2–0.3 m (7.9–11.8 in) (0.17×) | announced 29 January 2013 |
| Panasonic | Panasonic Lumix G X Vario PZ 14-42mm f/3.5-5.6 Asph., Power O.I.S. | 14-42mm | 28-84mm | f/3.5-5.6 | 37 | 61 mm × 26.8 mm (2.40 in × 1.06 in) | 95 g (3.4 oz) | 9e/8g | 0.2–0.3 m (7.9–11.8 in) (0.17×) | announced 26 August 2011 |
| Panasonic | Panasonic Lumix G Vario 14-45mm f/3.5-5.6 Asph., Mega O.I.S. | 14-45mm | 28-90mm | f/3.5-5.6 | 52 | 60 mm × 60 mm (2.4 in × 2.4 in) | 195 g (6.9 oz) | 12e/9g | 0.30 m (12 in) (0.17×) | |
| Panasonic | Panasonic Leica DG Vario-Summilux 25-50mm f/1.7 Asph. | 25-50mm | 50-100mm | f/1.7 | 77 | 87.6 mm × 127.6 mm (3.45 in × 5.02 in) | 654 g (23.1 oz) | 16e/11g | 0.28 m (11 in) (0.14×) | Splash / Dust / Freezeproof. Announced Jul 2021 |

=== Telephoto zoom lenses ===
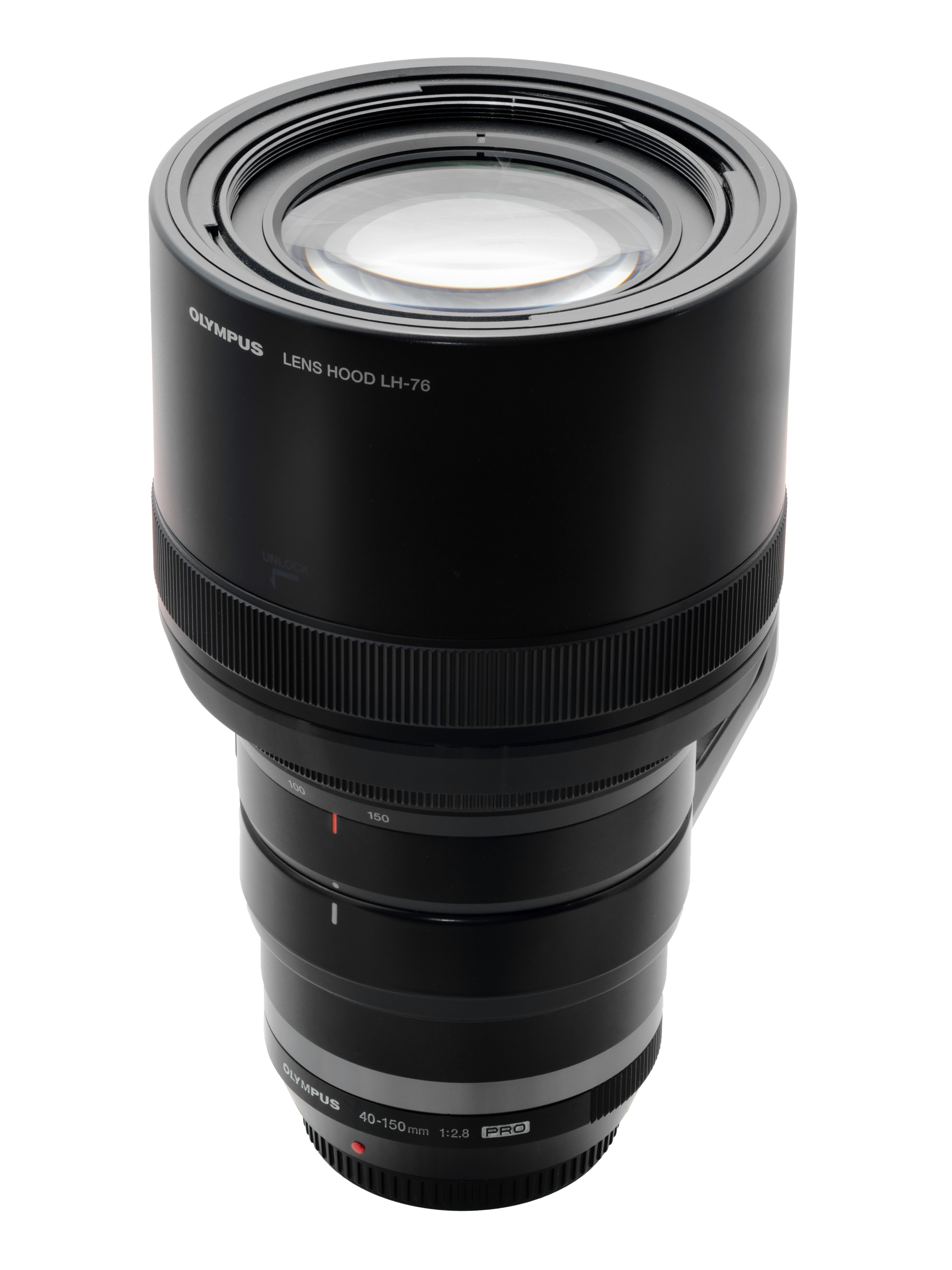
Olympus M.Zuiko Digital ED 40-150mm f/2.8 PRO

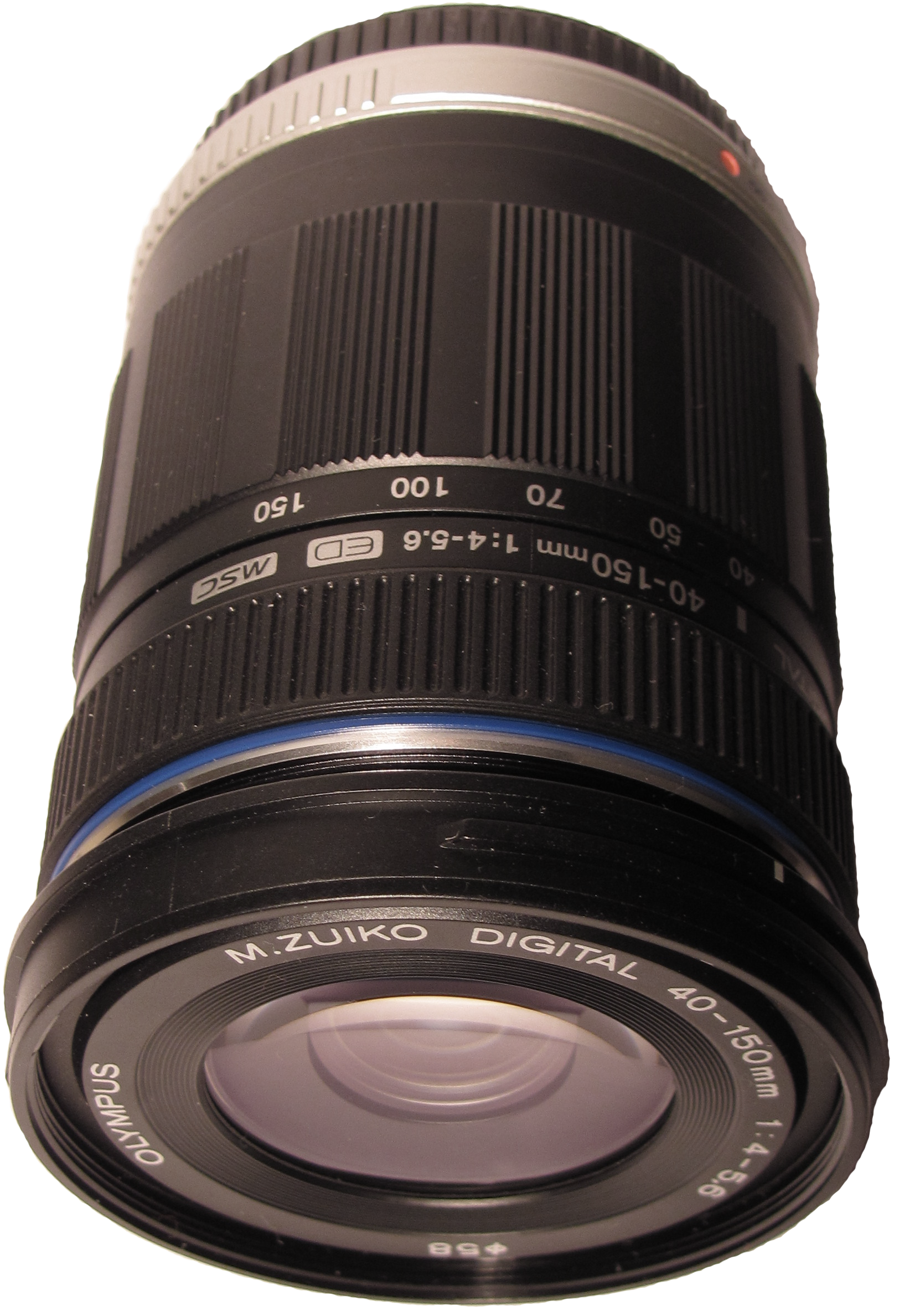
Olympus M.Zuiko Digital ED 40-150mm f/4-5.6

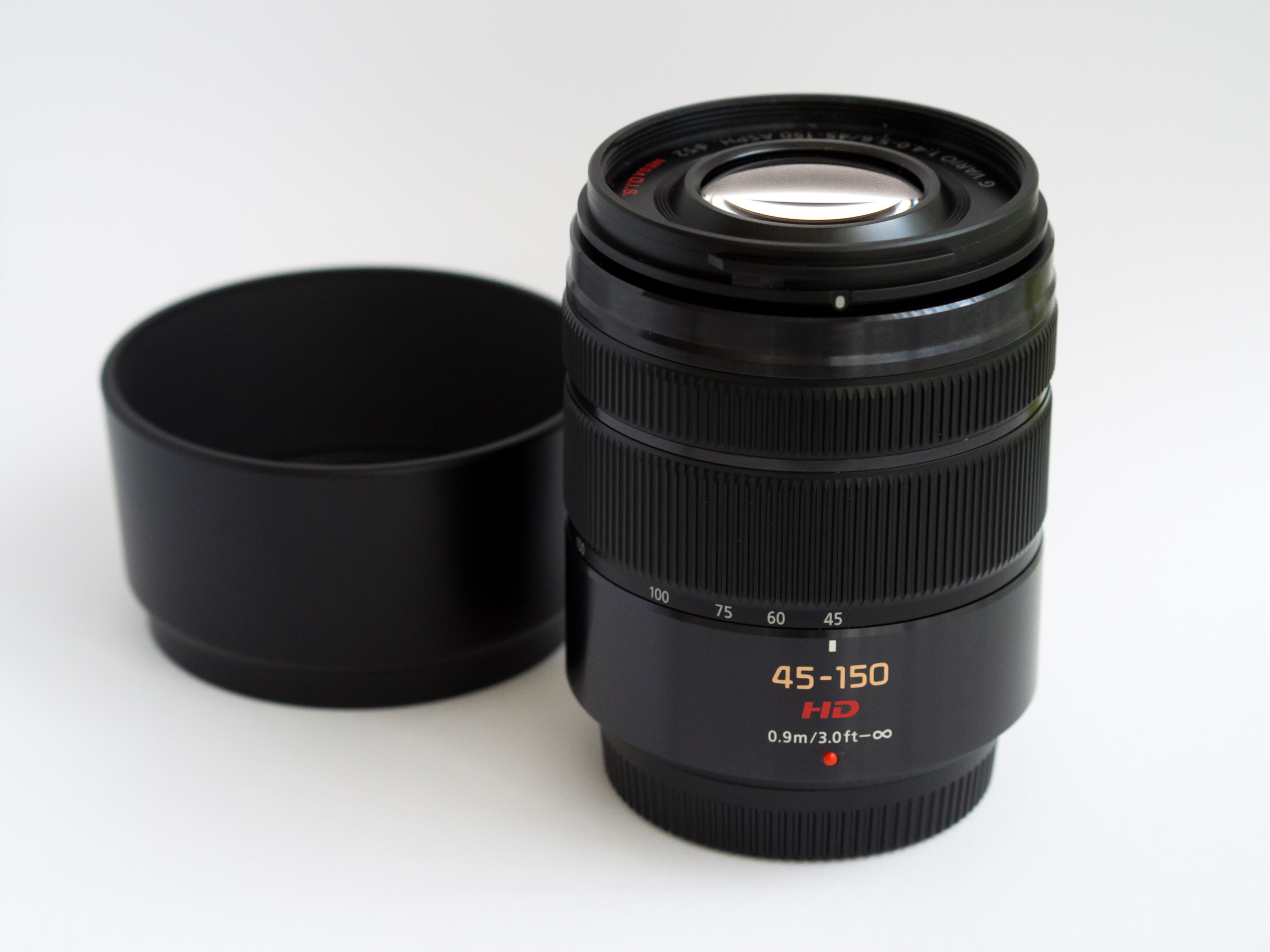
Panasonic Lumix G Vario 45-150mm f/4-5.6 Asph., Mega O.I.S.

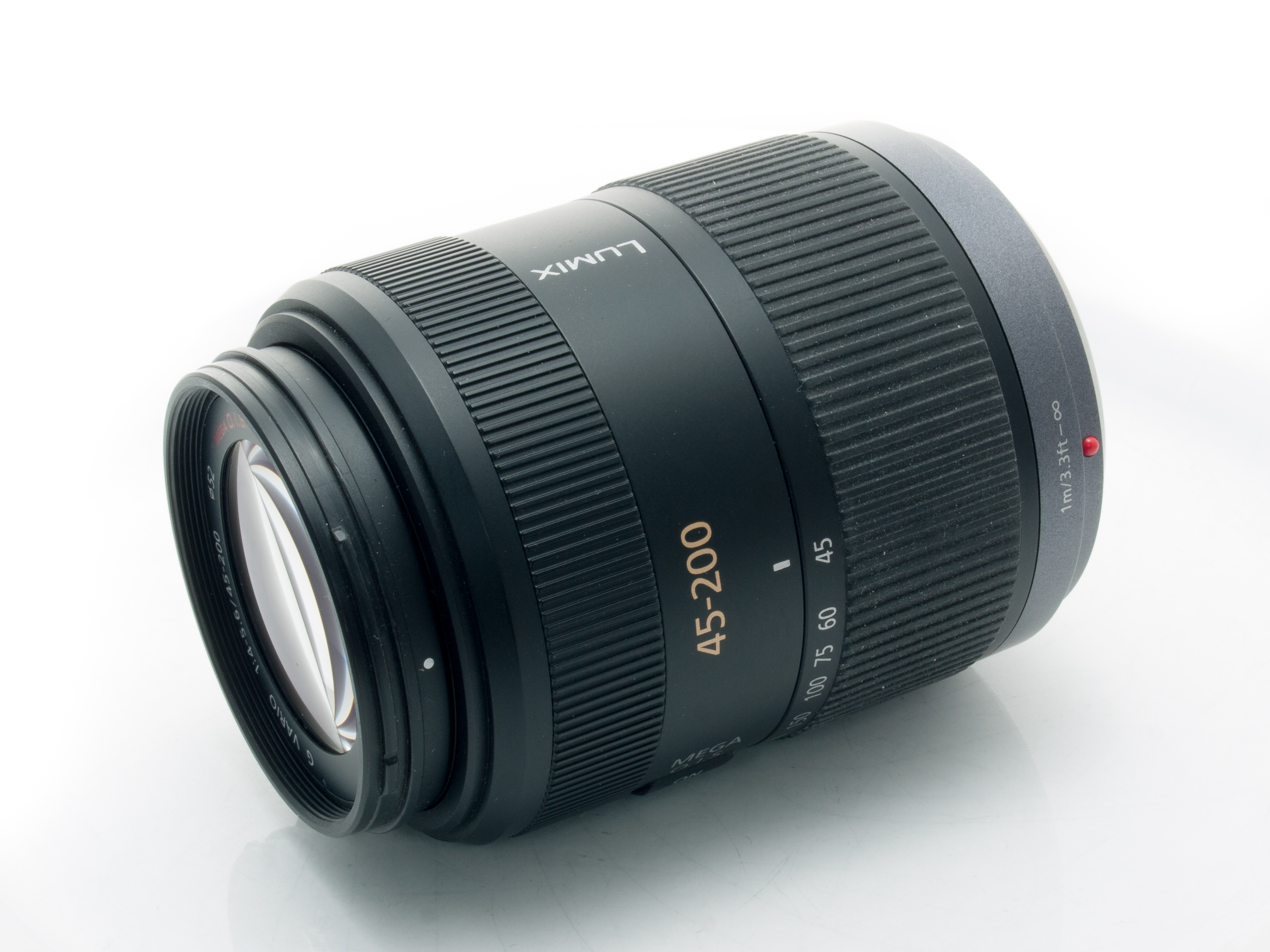
Panasonic Lumix G Vario 45-200mm f/4-5.6, Mega O.I.S.

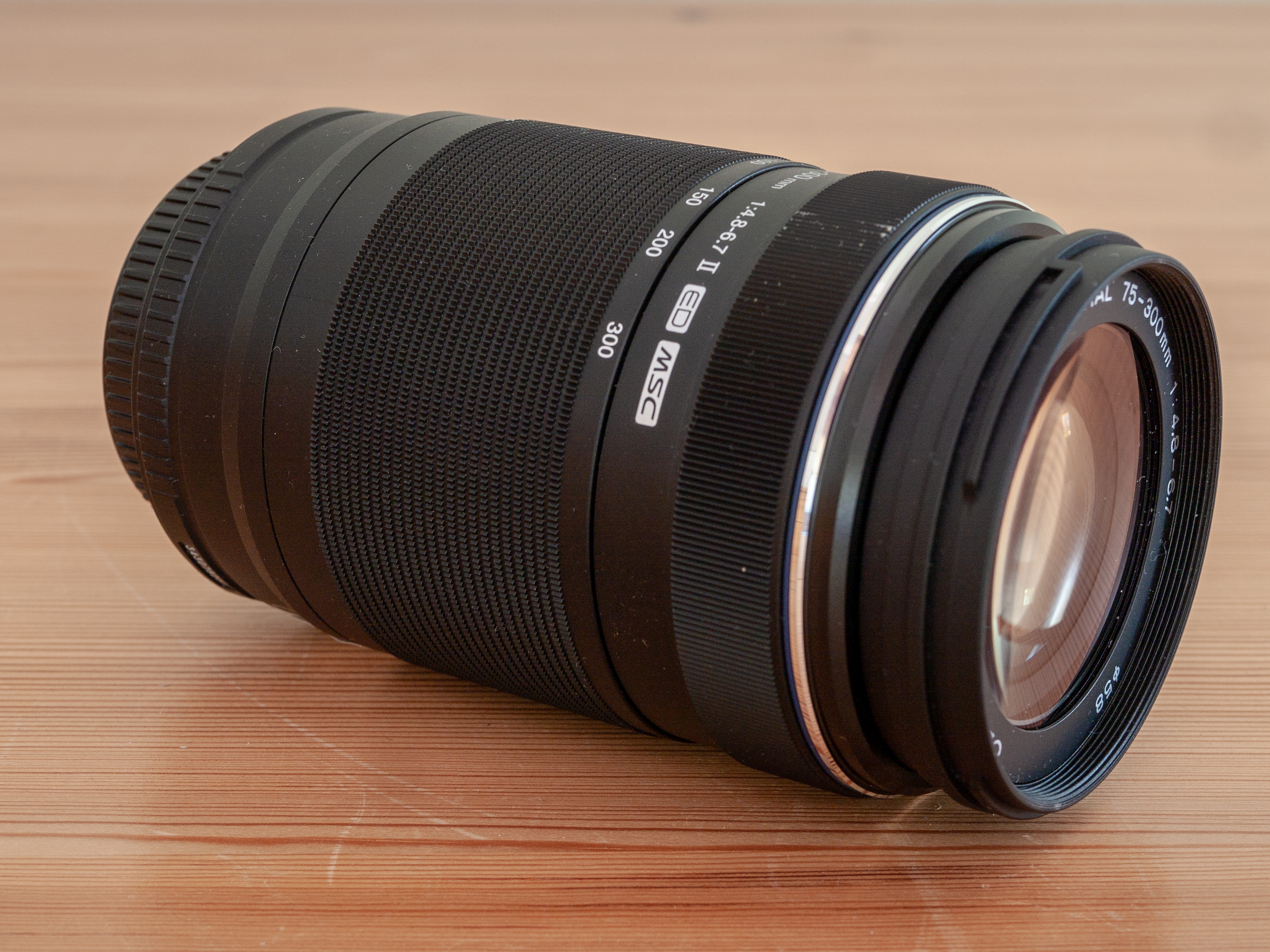
Olympus M.Zuiko Digital ED 75-300mm f/4.8-6.7 II

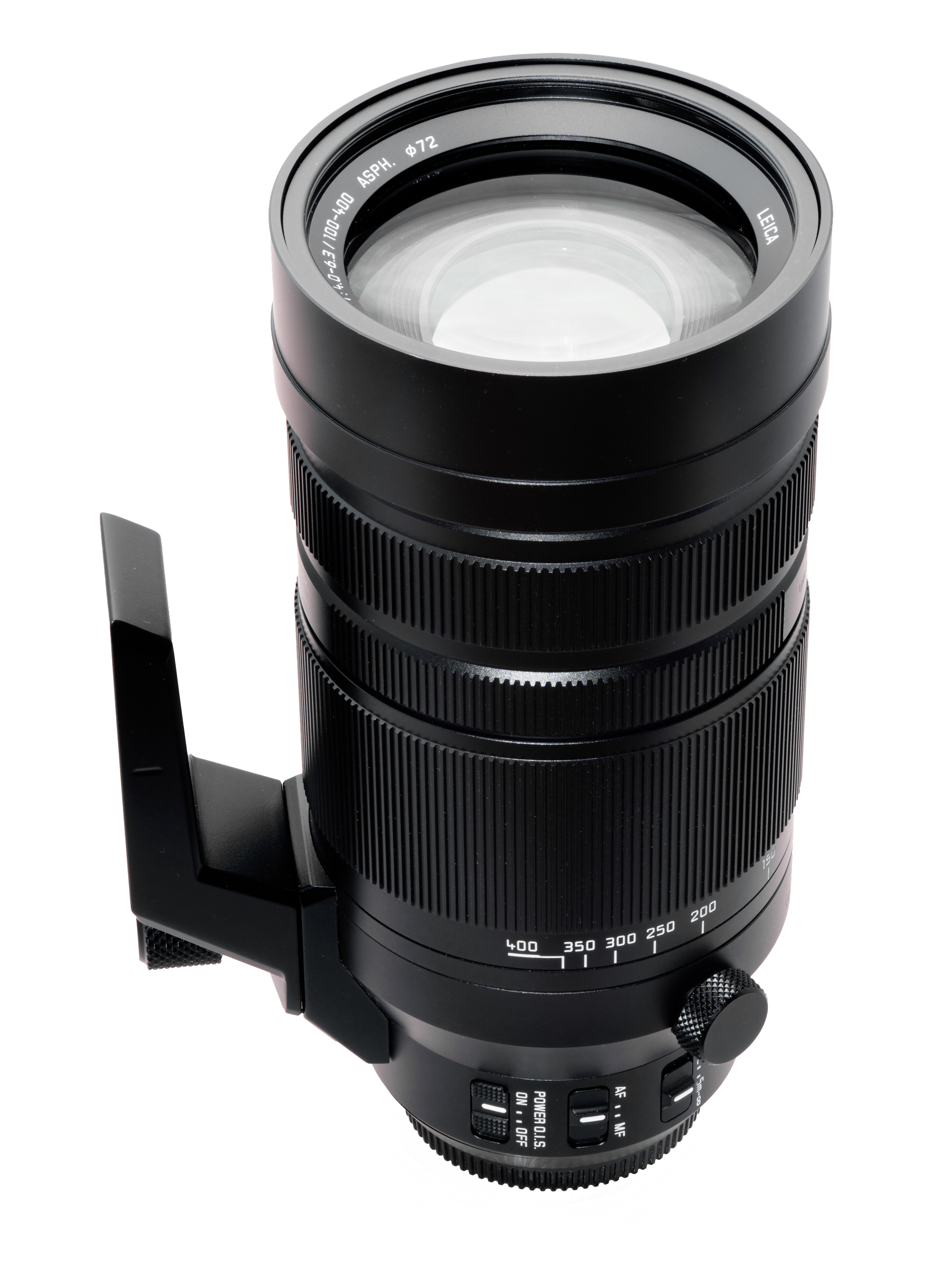
Panasonic Leica DG Vario-Elmar 100-400 mm f/4.0-6.3 Asph., Power O.I.S.

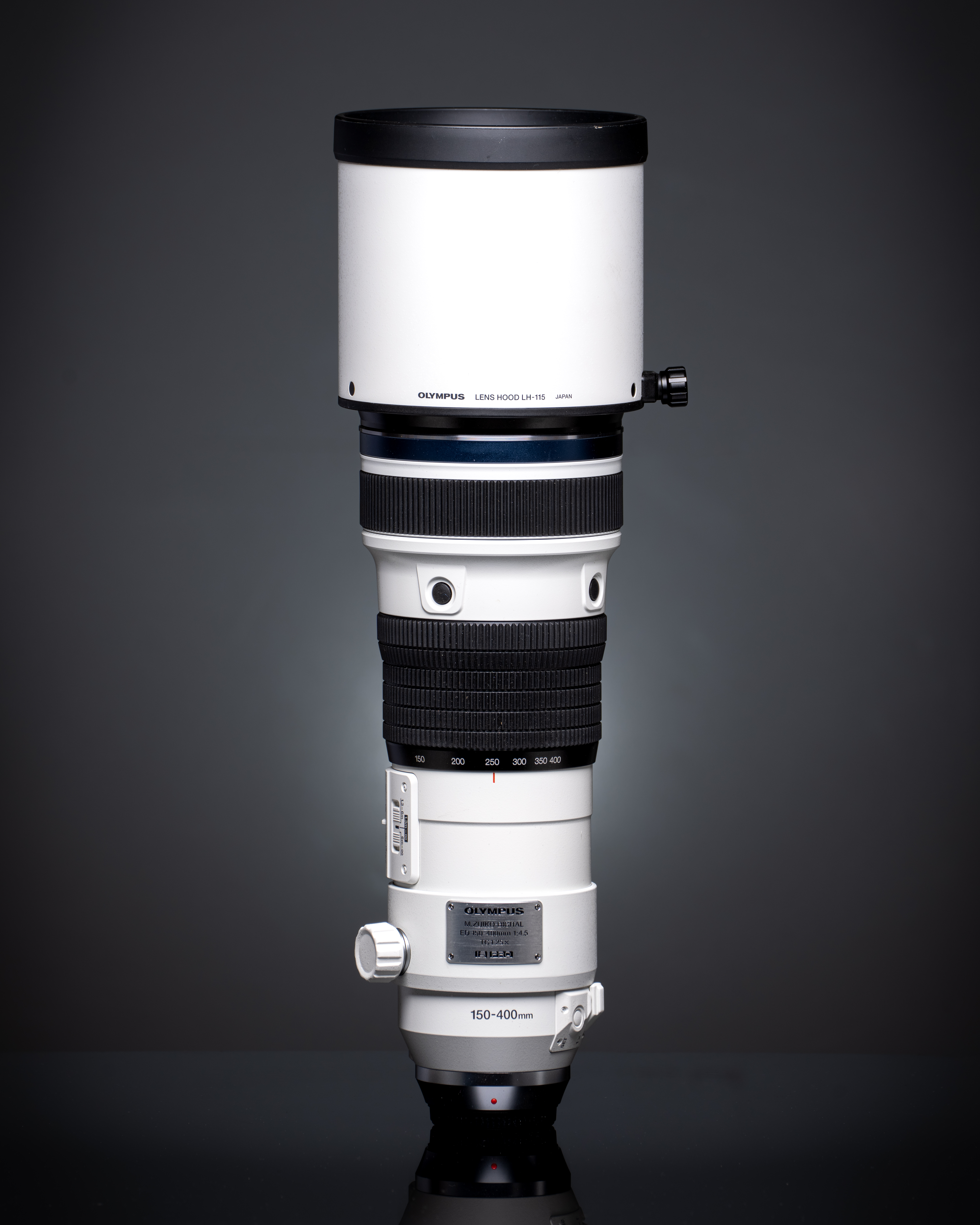
Olympus M.Zuiko Digital ED 150-400mm f/4.5 TC1.25X IS PRO

| Brand | Product Name | Focal length | 35mm equiv. | Max. Aperture | Filter (mm) | Dims. (Φ×L) | Weight | Constr. | Min. focus (mag.) | Remarks |
|---|---|---|---|---|---|---|---|---|---|---|
| Panasonic | Panasonic Lumix G X Vario 35-100mm f/2.8, Power O.I.S. | 35-100mm | 70-200mm | f/2.8 | 58 | 67.4 mm × 99.9 mm (2.65 in × 3.93 in) | 360 g (13 oz) | 18e/13g | 0.85 m (33 in) (0.1×) | weather-sealed, announced 17 September 2012 |
| Panasonic | Panasonic Lumix G X Vario 35-100mm f/2.8 II Power O.I.S. | 35-100mm | 70-200mm | f/2.8 | 58 | 67.4 mm × 99.9 mm (2.65 in × 3.93 in) | 357 g (12.6 oz) | 18e/13g | 0.85 m (33 in) (0.1×) | weather-sealed |
| Panasonic | Leica DG Vario-Elmarit 35-100mm f/2.8, Power O.I.S. | 35-100mm | 70-200mm | f/2.8 | 58 | 67.4 mm × 99.9 mm (2.65 in × 3.93 in) | 360 g (13 oz) | 18e/13g | 0.85 m (33 in) (0.1×) | |
| Panasonic | Panasonic Lumix G Vario 35-100mm f/4-5.6 Asph., Mega O.I.S. | 35-100mm | 70-200mm | f/4-5.6 | 46 | 55.5 mm × 50 mm (2.19 in × 1.97 in) | 135 g (4.8 oz) | 12e/9g | 0.90 m (35 in) (0.11×) | |
| Olympus | Olympus M.Zuiko Digital ED 40-150mm f/2.8 PRO | 40-150mm | 80-300mm | f/2.8 | 72 | 79.4 mm × 160 mm (3.13 in × 6.30 in) | 880 g (31 oz) | 16e/10g | 0.7 m (28 in) (0.21×) | weather-sealed, announced September 2013 |
| OM System | OM System M.Zuiko Digital ED 40-150mm f/4 PRO | 40-150mm | 80-300mm | f/4 | 62 | 68.9 mm × 99.4 mm (2.71 in × 3.91 in) | 382 g (13.5 oz) | 15e/9g | 0.70 m (28 in) (0.21×) | IP53 weather-sealed, announced February 2022 |
| Olympus | Olympus M.Zuiko Digital ED 40-150mm f/4-5.6 | 40-150mm | 80-300mm | f/4-5.6 | 58 | 63.5 mm × 83 mm (2.50 in × 3.27 in) | 190 g (6.7 oz) | 13e/10g | 0.9 m (35 in) (0.16×) | discontinued, announced September 2010 |
| Olympus | Olympus M.Zuiko Digital ED 40-150mm f/4-5.6 R | 40-150mm | 80-300mm | f/4-5.6 | 58 | 63.5 mm × 83 mm (2.50 in × 3.27 in) | 190 g (6.7 oz) | 13e/10g | 0.9 m (35 in) (0.16×) | |
| Kodak | Kodak PixPro 42.5-160mm f/3.9-5.9 SZ ED | 42.5-160mm | 85-320mm | f/3.9-5.9 | 49 | 58.7 mm × 80.4 mm (2.31 in × 3.17 in) | 205 g (7.2 oz) | 15e/10g | 1 m (39 in) (0.042×) | |
| Panasonic | Panasonic Lumix G Vario 45-150mm f/4-5.6 Asph., Mega O.I.S. | 45-150mm | 90-300mm | f/4-5.6 | 52 | 62 mm × 73 mm (2.4 in × 2.9 in) | 200 g (7.1 oz) | 12e/9g | 0.9 m (35 in) (0.17×) | announced 18 July 2012 |
| Panasonic | Panasonic Lumix G X Vario PZ 45-175mm f/4-5.6 Asph., Power O.I.S. | 45-175mm | 90-350mm | f/4-5.6 | 46 | 61.6 mm × 90 mm (2.43 in × 3.54 in) | 210 g (7.4 oz) | 14e/10g | 0.9 m (35 in) (0.2×) | |
| Panasonic | Panasonic Lumix G Vario 45-200mm f/4-5.6, Mega O.I.S. | 45-200mm | 90-400mm | f/4-5.6 | 52 | 70 mm × 100 mm (2.8 in × 3.9 in) | 380 g (13 oz) | 16e/13g | 1.0 m (39 in) (0.19×) | |
| Panasonic | Panasonic Lumix G Vario 45-200mm f/4-5.6 II, Power O.I.S | 45-200mm | 90-400mm | f/4-5.6 | 52 | 70 mm × 100 mm (2.8 in × 3.9 in) | 370 g (13 oz) | 16e/13g | 1.0 m (39 in) (0.19×) | weather-sealed |
| Panasonic | Panasonic Leica DG Vario-Elmarit 50-200mm f/2.8-4 Asph., Power O.I.S. | 50-200mm | 100-400mm | f/2.8-4 | 67 | 76 mm × 132 mm (3.0 in × 5.2 in) | 655 g (23.1 oz) | 21e/15g | 0.75 m (30 in) (0.25×) | announced 26 February 2018 |
| OM System | Olympus M.Zuiko Digital ED 50-200mm f/2.8 IS PRO | 50-200mm | 100-400mm | f/2.8 | 77 | 91.4 mm × 225.8 mm (3.60 in × 8.89 in) | 1,075 g (37.9 oz) | 21e/13g | 0.78 m (31 in) (0.25×) | announced 10 September 2025 |
| Olympus | Olympus M.Zuiko Digital ED 75-300mm f/4.8-6.7 | 75-300mm | 150-600mm | f/4.8-6.7 | 58 | 70 mm × 116 mm (2.8 in × 4.6 in) | 430 g (15 oz) | 18e/13g | 0.9–1.5 m (35–59 in) (0.18×) | discontinued |
| Olympus | Olympus M.Zuiko Digital ED 75-300mm f/4.8-6.7 II | 75-300mm | 150-600mm | f/4.8-6.7 | 58 | 69 mm × 116.5 mm (2.72 in × 4.59 in) | 423 g (14.9 oz) | 18e/13g | 0.9–1.5 m (35–59 in) (0.18×) | |
| Panasonic | Panasonic Lumix G Vario 100-300mm f/4-5.6, Mega O.I.S. | 100-300mm | 200-600mm | f/4-5.6 | 67 | 73.6 mm × 126 mm (2.90 in × 4.96 in) | 520 g (18 oz) | 17e/12g | 1.50 m (59 in) (0.21×) | discontinued |
| Panasonic | Panasonic Lumix G Vario 100-300mm f/4-5.6 II Power O.I.S | 100-300mm | 200-600mm | f/4-5.6 | 67 | 73.6 mm × 126 mm (2.90 in × 4.96 in) | 520 g (18 oz) | 17e/12g | 1.50 m (59 in) (0.21×) | upgraded support for harsh weather conditions (splash & dust-proof) |
| Panasonic | Panasonic Leica DG Vario-Elmar 100-400 mm f/4.0-6.3 Asph., Power O.I.S. | 100-400mm | 200-800mm | f/4.0-6.3 | 72 | 83 mm × 171.5 mm (3.27 in × 6.75 in) | 985 g (34.7 oz) | 20e/13g | 1.3 m (51 in) (0.25×) | weather-sealed, announced 5 January 2016 |
| Panasonic | Panasonic Leica DG Vario-Elmar 100-400 mm f/4.0-6.3 II Asph., Power O.I.S. | 100-400mm | 200-800mm | f/4.0-6.3 | 72 | 83.0 mm × 171.5 mm (3.27 in × 6.75 in) | 985 g (34.7 oz) | 20e/13g | 1.3 m (51 in) (0.25×) | weather-sealed |
| Olympus | Olympus M.Zuiko Digital ED 100-400mm f/5.0-6.3 IS | 100-400mm | 200-800mm | f/5.0-6.3 | 72 | 86.4 mm × 205.7 mm (3.40 in × 8.10 in) | 1,120 g (40 oz) | 21e/15g | 1.3 m (51 in) (0.29×) | announced 4 August 2020 |
| Olympus | Olympus M.Zuiko Digital ED 150-400mm f/4.5 IS PRO | 150-400mm (187.5-500mm) | 300-800mm (375-1000mm) | f/4.5 (f/5.6) | 95 | 115.8 mm × 314.3 mm (4.56 in × 12.37 in) | 1,875 g (66.1 oz) | 28e/18g | 1.3 m (51 in) (0.29/0.57×) | announced 24 Jan 2019; includes 1.25× teleconverter (values in brackets are with teleconverter engaged). |
| OM Digital Solutions | OM M.Zuiko Digital ED 150-600mm f/5.0-6.3 IS | 150-600mm | 300-1200mm | f/5.0-6.3 | 95 | 109.4 mm × 264.4 mm (4.31 in × 10.41 in) | 2,065 g (72.8 oz) | 25e/15g | 0.56–2.8 m (22–110 in) (0.35×) | |

=== Superzoom lenses ===
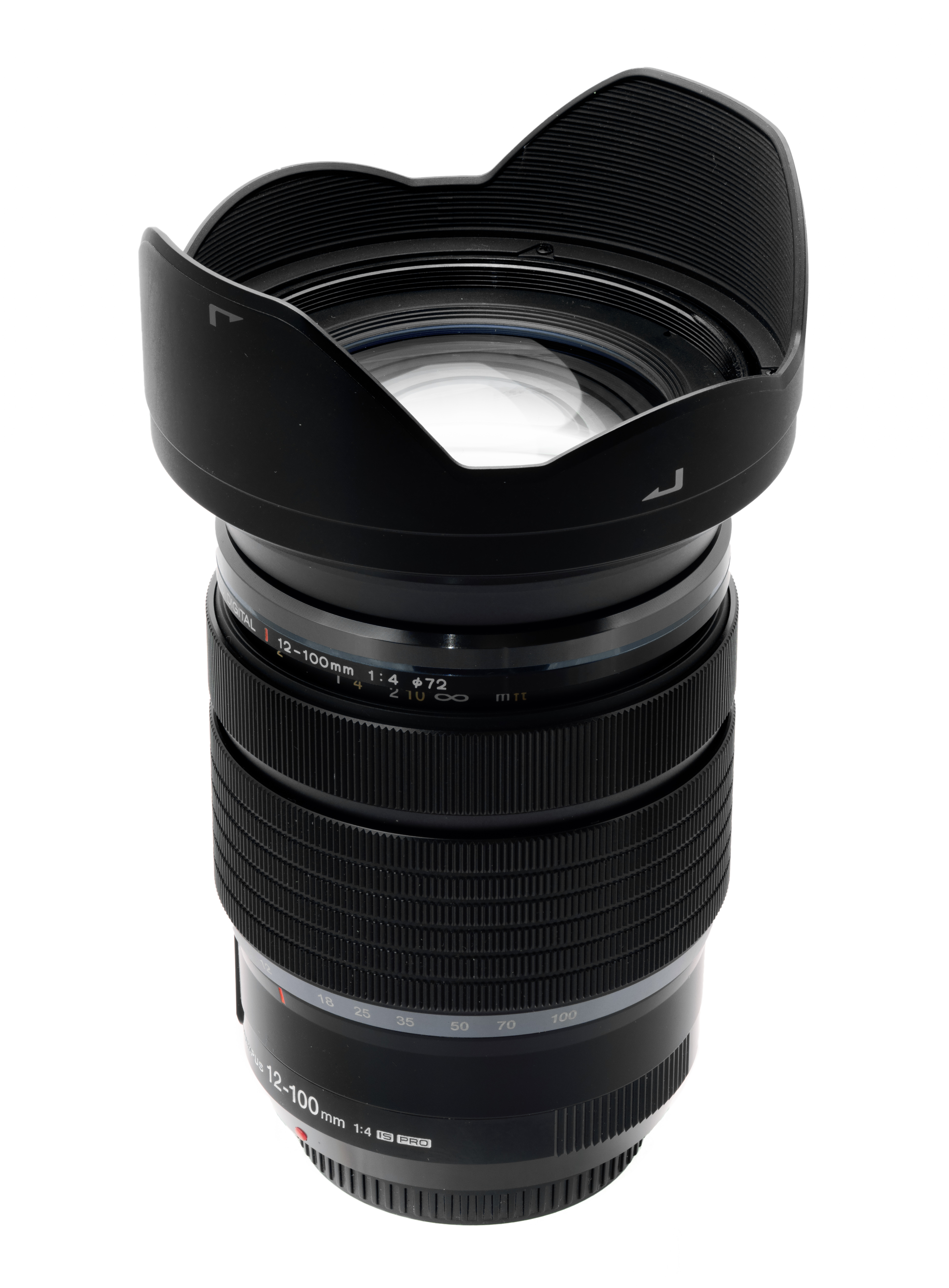
Olympus M.Zuiko ED 12-100mm f/4.0 IS PRO

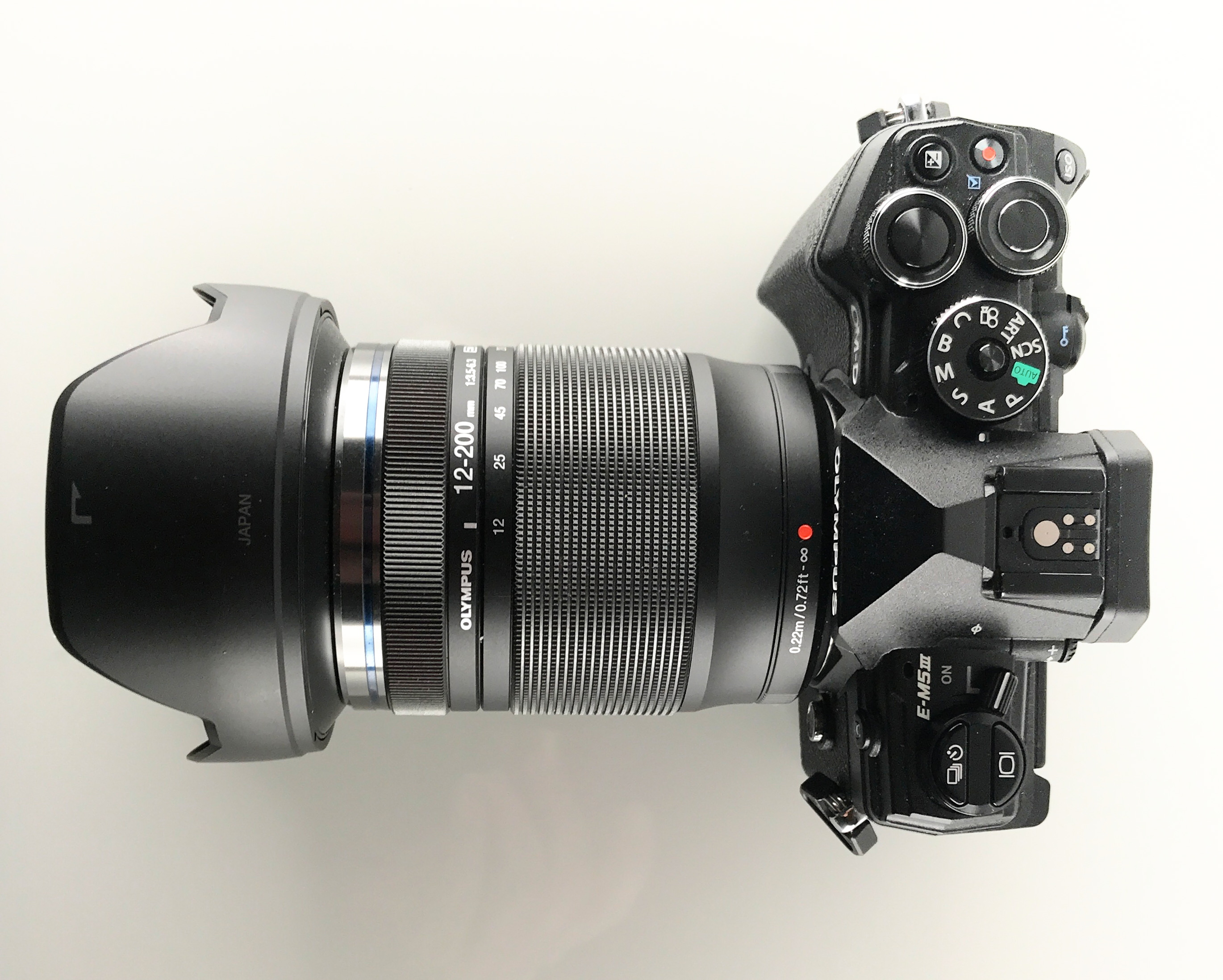
Olympus M.Zuiko Digital ED 12-200mm f/3.5-6.3

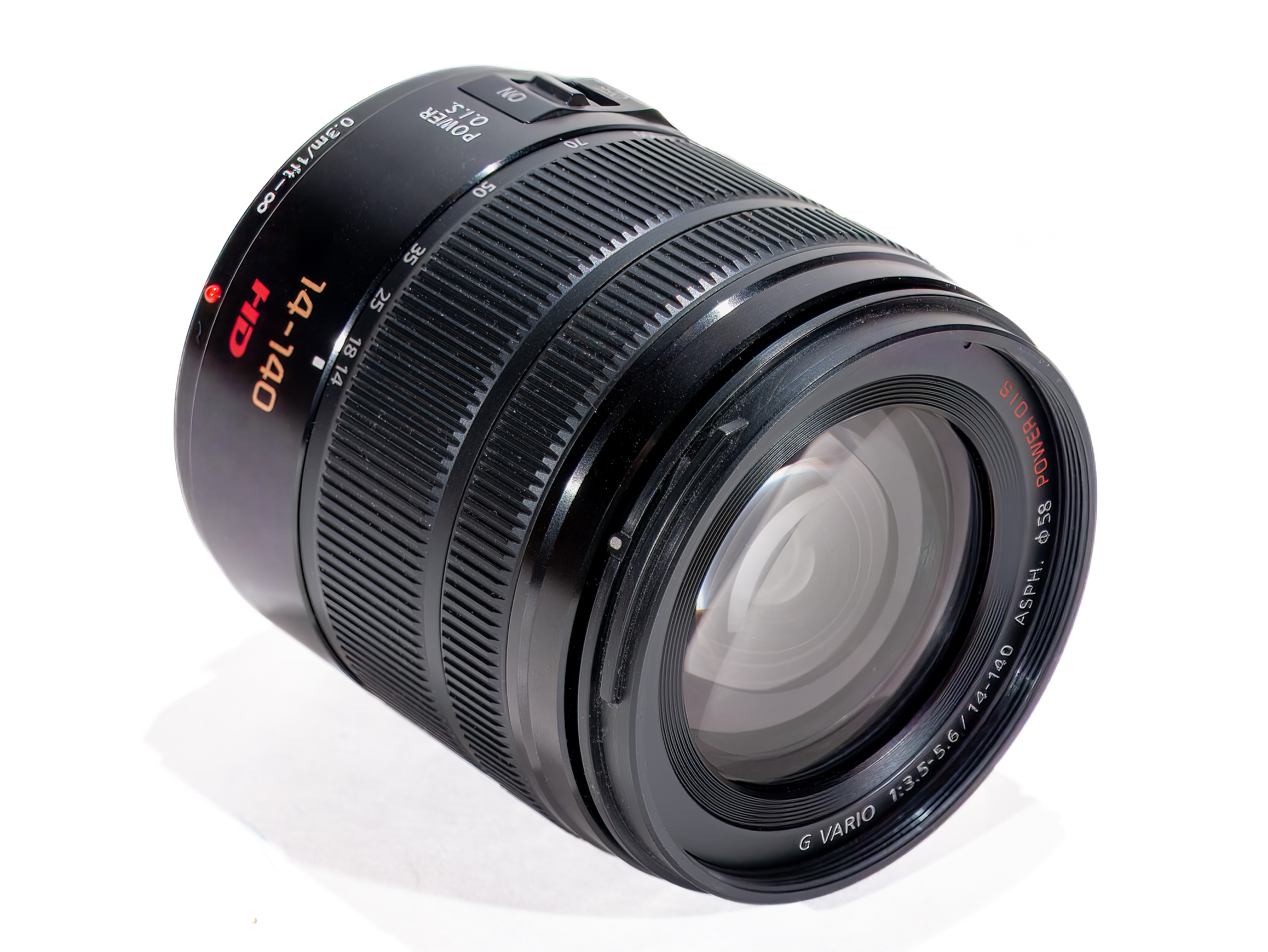
Panasonic Lumix G Vario 14-140mm f/3.5-5.6 Asph. Power O.I.S.

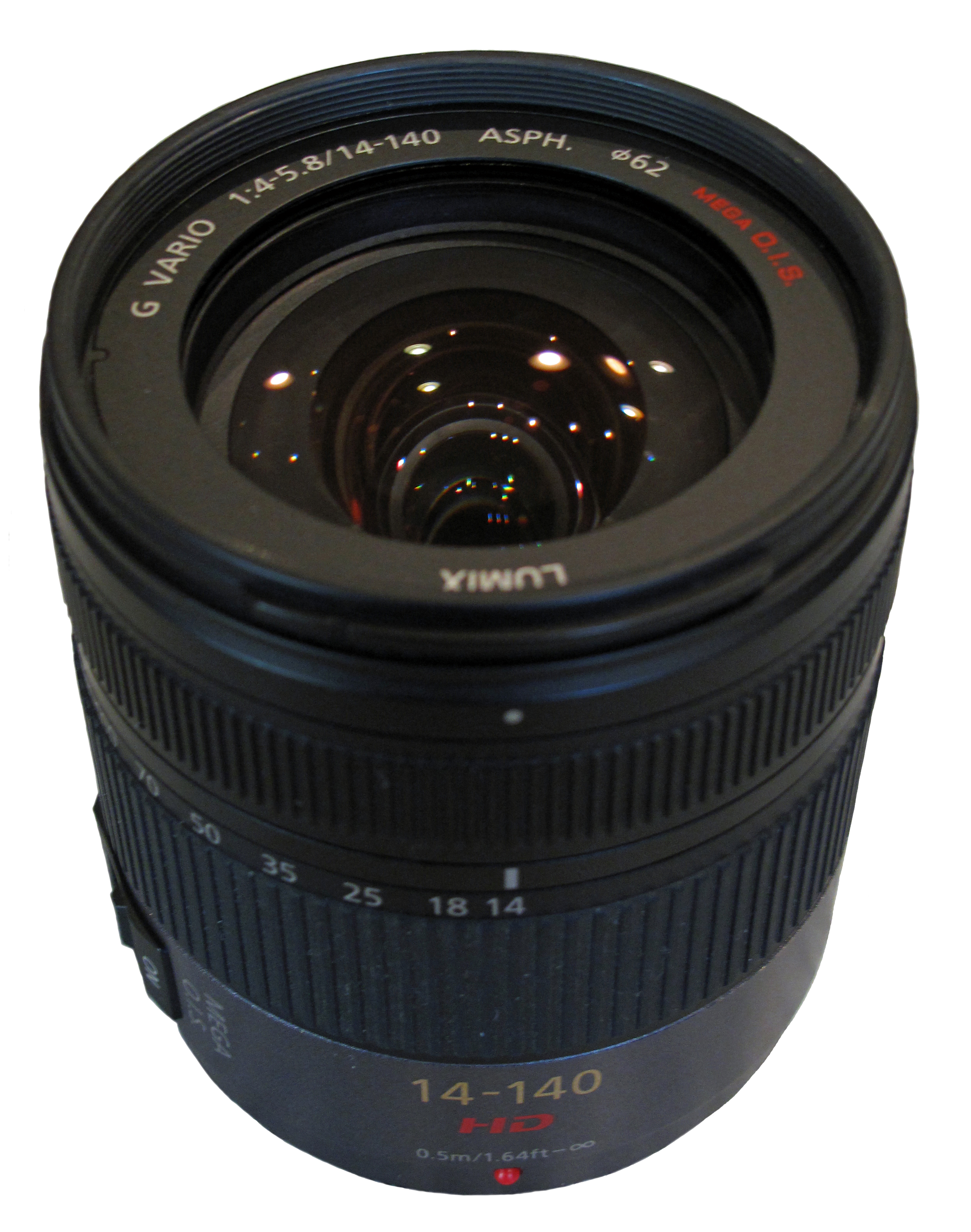
Panasonic Lumix G Vario HD 14-140mm f/4-5.8 Mega O.I.S.

| Brand | Product Name | Focal length | 35mm equiv. | Max. Aperture | Filter (mm) | Dims. (Φ×L) | Weight | Constr. | Min. focus (mag.) | Remarks |
|---|---|---|---|---|---|---|---|---|---|---|
| Olympus | Olympus M.Zuiko ED 12-100mm f/4.0 IS PRO | 12-100mm | 24-200mm f/8 | f/4.0 | 72 | 77.5 mm × 116.5 mm (3.05 in × 4.59 in) | 561 g (19.8 oz) | 17e/11g | 0.15–0.45 m (5.9–17.7 in) (0.3×) | announced 19 September 2016 |
| Olympus | Olympus M.Zuiko Digital ED 12-200mm f/3.5-6.3 | 12-200mm | 24-400mm f/7-12.6 | f/3.5-6.3 | 72 | 77.5 mm × 99.7 mm (3.05 in × 3.93 in) | 455 g (16.0 oz) | 16e/11g | 0.22–0.7 m (8.7–27.6 in) (0.23×) | announced 13 February 2019 |
| Panasonic | Panasonic Lumix G Vario 14-140mm f/3.5-5.6 Asph. Power O.I.S. | 14-140mm | 28-280mm f/7-11.2 | f/3.5-5.6 | 62 | 67 mm × 75 mm (2.6 in × 3.0 in) | 265 g (9.3 oz) | 14e/12g | 0.3–0.5 m (12–20 in) (0.25×) | announced 24 April 2013. |
| Panasonic | Panasonic Lumix G Vario HD 14-140mm f/4-5.8 Mega O.I.S. | 14-140mm | 28-280mm f/8-11.6 | f/4-5.8 | 58 | 70 mm × 84 mm (2.8 in × 3.3 in) | 460 g (16 oz) | 17e/13g | 0.5 m (20 in) (0.2×) | discontinued |
| Olympus | Olympus M.Zuiko Digital ED 14-150mm f/4-5.6 | 14-150mm | 28-300mm f/8-11.2 | f/4-5.6 | 58 | 63.5 mm × 83 mm (2.50 in × 3.27 in) | 280 g (9.9 oz) | 15e/11g | 0.5 m (20 in) (0.24×) | discontinued |
| Olympus | Olympus M.Zuiko Digital ED 14-150mm f/4-5.6 II | 14-150mm | 28-300mm f/8-11.2 | f/4-5.6 | 58 | 63.5 mm × 83 mm (2.50 in × 3.27 in) | 285 g (10.1 oz) | 15e/11g | 0.5 m (20 in) (0.22×) | announced 5 February 2015, upgraded with dustproofing / splashproofing |
| Tamron | Tamron 14-150mm Di III VC f/3.5-5.8 Di III VC (Model C001) | 14-150mm | 28-300mm f/7-11.6 | f/3.5-5.8 | 52 | 63.5 mm × 80 mm (2.50 in × 3.15 in) | 285 g (10.1 oz) | 17e/13g | 0.5 m (20 in) (0.26×) | announced 29 January 2013 |

== Autofocus prime lenses ==
On Jan 9, 2012 Sigma announced its first two lenses for Micro Four Thirds, the "30mm f/2.8 EX DN and the 19mm f/2.8 EX DN lenses in Micro Four Thirds mounts". In a press release posted on January 26, 2012, Olympus and Panasonic jointly announced that "ASTRODESIGN, Inc., Kenko Tokina Co., Ltd. and Tamron Co., Ltd. join[ed] the Micro Four Thirds System Standard Group". On January 26, 2012, Tokina and Tamron have indicated they would be designing lenses for the Micro 4/3 system as well. To date, both have released a single lens for the system, each.

=== Autofocus wide angle lenses ===
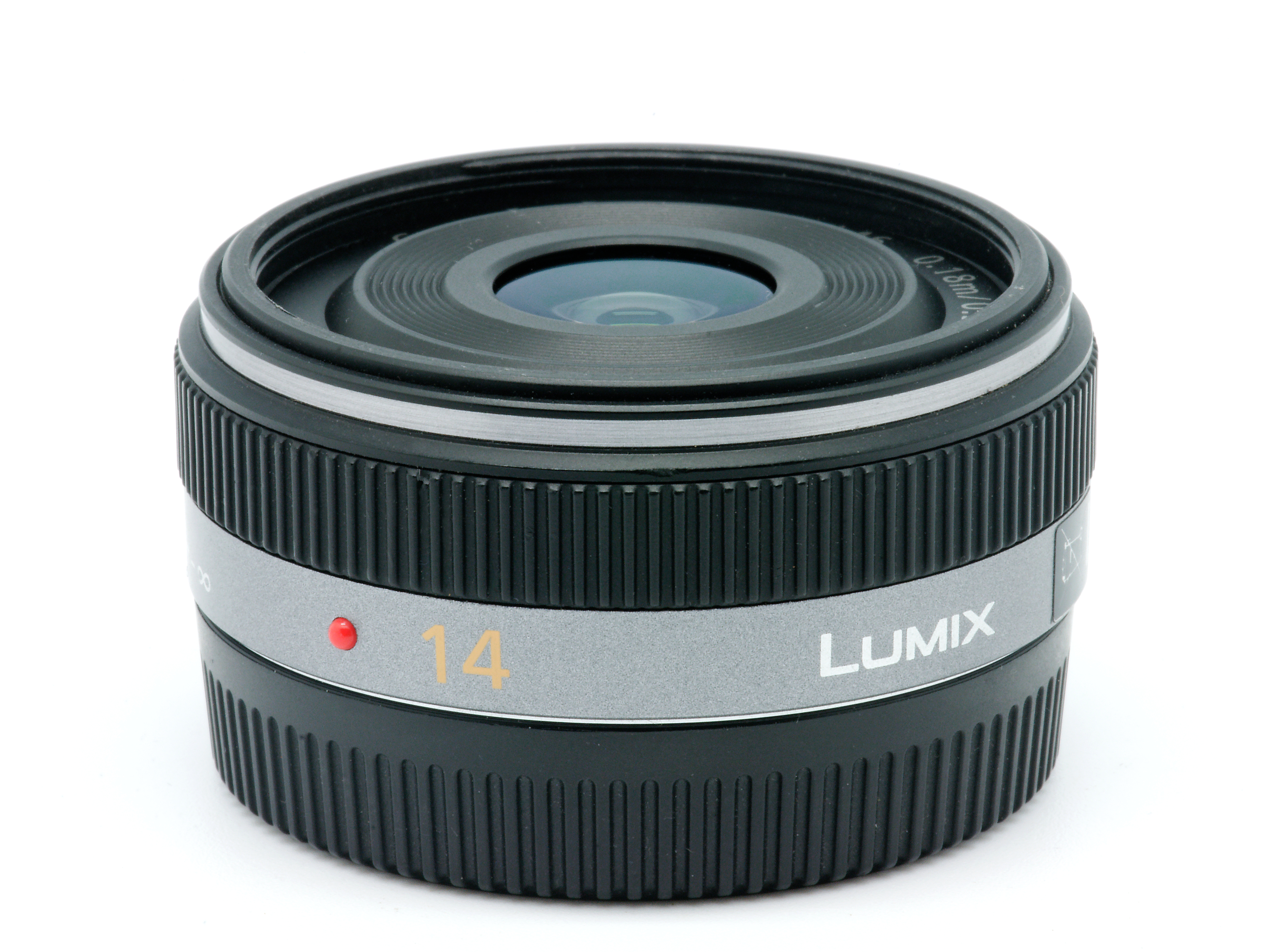
Panasonic Lumix G 14mm f/2.5 Asph. (discontinued)

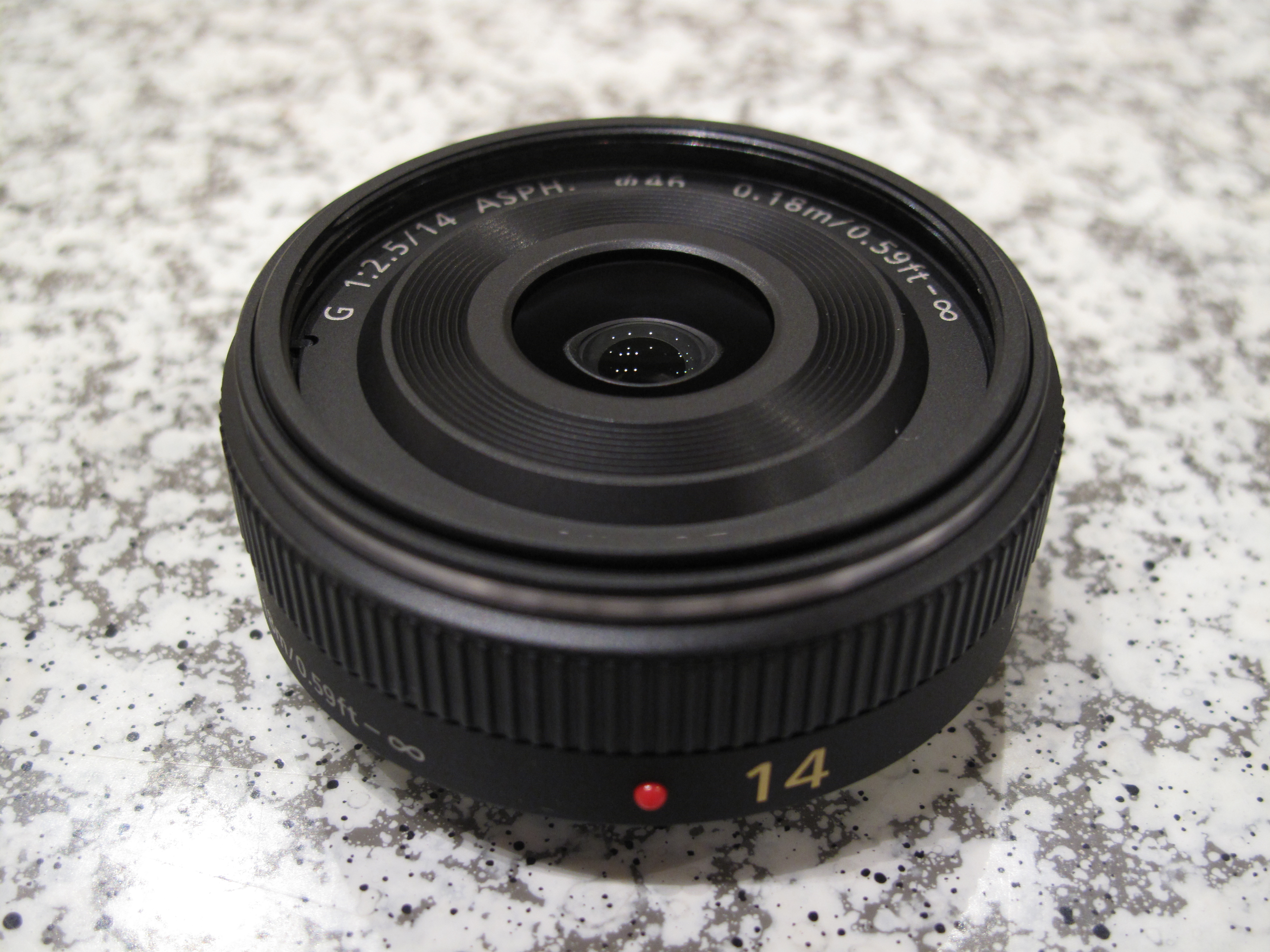
Panasonic Lumix G 14mm f/2.5 Asph. II

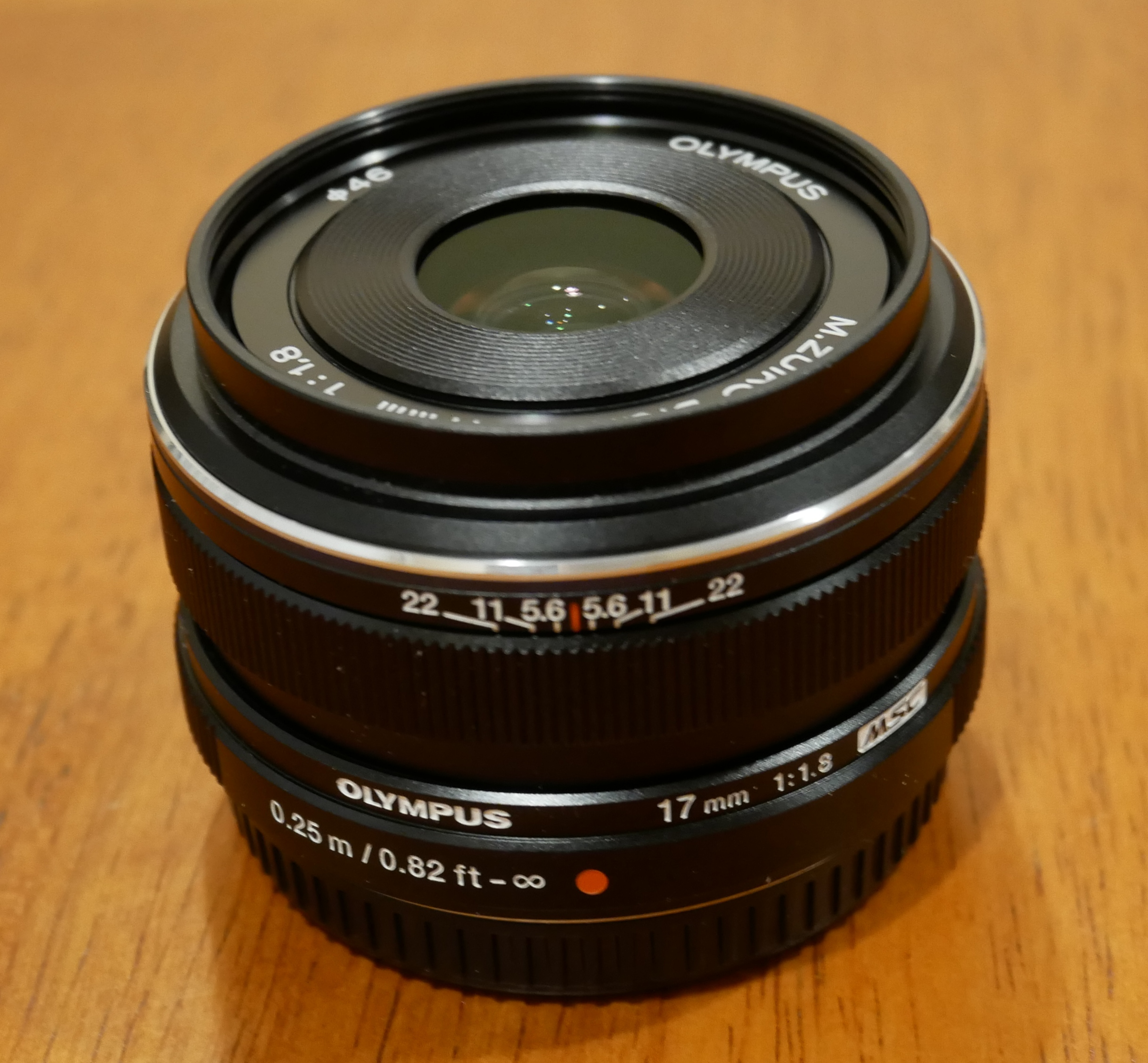
Olympus M.Zuiko Digital 17mm f/1.8

Ultra wide and Wide angle lenses with autofocus for Micro Four Thirds
| Brand | Product Name | Focal length | 35mm equiv. | Max. Aperture | Filter (mm) | Dims. (Φ×L) | Weight | Constr. | Min. focus (mag.) | Remarks |
|---|---|---|---|---|---|---|---|---|---|---|
| Panasonic | Panasonic Leica DG Summilux 9mm f/1.7 Asph. | 9mm | 18mm | f/1.7 | 55 | 60.8 mm × 52 mm (2.39 in × 2.05 in) | 130 g (4.6 oz) | 12e/9g | 0.095 m (3.7 in) (0.25×) | (announced 17 May 2022) |
| Panasonic | Panasonic Leica DG Summilux 12mm f/1.4 Asph. | 12mm | 24mm | f/1.4 | 62 | 70 mm × 70 mm (2.8 in × 2.8 in) | 335 g (11.8 oz) | 15e/12g | 0.20 m (7.9 in) (0.1×) | (announced 15 June 2016) |
| Olympus | Olympus M.Zuiko Digital ED 12mm f/2 | 12mm | 24mm | f/2 | 46 | 56 mm × 43 mm (2.2 in × 1.7 in) | 130 g (4.6 oz) | 11e/8g | 0.2 m (7.9 in) (0.08×) | |
| Panasonic | Panasonic Lumix G 14mm f/2.5 Asph. | 14mm | 28mm | f/2.5 | 46 | 55.5 mm × 20.5 mm (2.19 in × 0.81 in) | 55 g (1.9 oz) | 6e/5g | 0.18 m (7.1 in) (0.10×) | discontinued |
| Panasonic | Panasonic Lumix G 14mm f/2.5 II Asph. | 14mm | 28mm | f/2.5 | 46 | 55.5 mm × 20.5 mm (2.19 in × 0.81 in) | 55 g (1.9 oz) | 6e/5g | 0.18 m (7.1 in) (0.10×) | |
| DJI | DJI 15mm f/1.7 Asph. | 15mm | 30mm | f/1.7 | 46 | 57.5 mm × 36 mm (2.26 in × 1.42 in) | 115 g (4.1 oz) | 9e/7g | 0.2 m (7.9 in) (0.10×) | Rebadged Panasonic Leica DG Summilux 15mm f/1.7 Asph. |
| Panasonic | Panasonic Leica DG Summilux 15mm f/1.7 Asph. | 15mm | 30mm | f/1.7 | 46 | 57.5 mm × 36 mm (2.26 in × 1.42 in) | 115 g (4.1 oz) | 9e/7g | 0.2 m (7.9 in) (0.10×) | (announced 17 October 2013) |
| Sigma | Sigma 16mm f/1.4 DC DN | Contemporary | 16mm | 32mm | f/1.4 | 67 | 72.2 mm × 91.1 mm (2.84 in × 3.59 in) | 395 g (13.9 oz) | 16e/13g | 0.25 m (9.8 in) (0.10×) | (announced 24 October 2017) |
| Olympus | Olympus M.Zuiko Digital ED 17mm f/1.2 PRO | 17mm | 34mm | f/1.2 | 62 | 68.2 mm × 87 mm (2.69 in × 3.43 in) | 390 g (14 oz) | 15e/11g | 0.2 m (7.9 in) (0.15×) | (announced 25 October 2017) |
| OM System | OM System M.Zuiko Digital 17mm f/1.8 II | 17mm | 34mm | f/1.8 | 46 | 57.6 mm × 37.6 mm (2.27 in × 1.48 in) | 112 g (4.0 oz) | 9e/6g | 0.25 m (9.8 in)(0.08×) | (announced 05 February 2025) (Weather Sealed) |
| Olympus | Olympus M.Zuiko Digital 17mm f/1.8 | 17mm | 34mm | f/1.8 | 46 | 57.5 mm × 35.5 mm (2.26 in × 1.40 in) | 120 g (4.2 oz) | 9e/6g | 0.25 m (9.8 in) (0.08×) | |
| Olympus | Olympus M.Zuiko Digital 17mm f/2.8 | 17mm | 34mm | f/2.8 | 37 | 57 mm × 22 mm (2.24 in × 0.87 in) | 71 g (2.5 oz) | 6e/4g | 0.2 m (7.9 in) (0.11×) | |
| YONGNUO | YONGNUO YN17mm f/1.7M | 17mm | 34mm | f/1.7 | 52 | 65.8 mm × 77.8 mm (2.59 in × 3.06 in) | 180 g (6.3 oz) | 10e/9g | 0.18 m (7.1 in) (0.15×) | |
| Sigma | Sigma 19mm f/2.8 DN Art | 19mm | 38mm | f/2.8 | 46 | 60.8 mm × 45.7 mm (2.39 in × 1.80 in) | 150 g (5.3 oz) | 8e/6g | 0.2 m (7.9 in) (0.14×) | |
| Sigma | Sigma 19mm f/2.8 EX DN | 19mm | 38mm | f/2.8 | 46 | 60.6 mm × 45.7 mm (2.39 in × 1.80 in) | 140 g (4.9 oz) | 8e/6g | 0.2 m (7.9 in) (0.14×) | discontinued |

=== Autofocus standard lenses ===
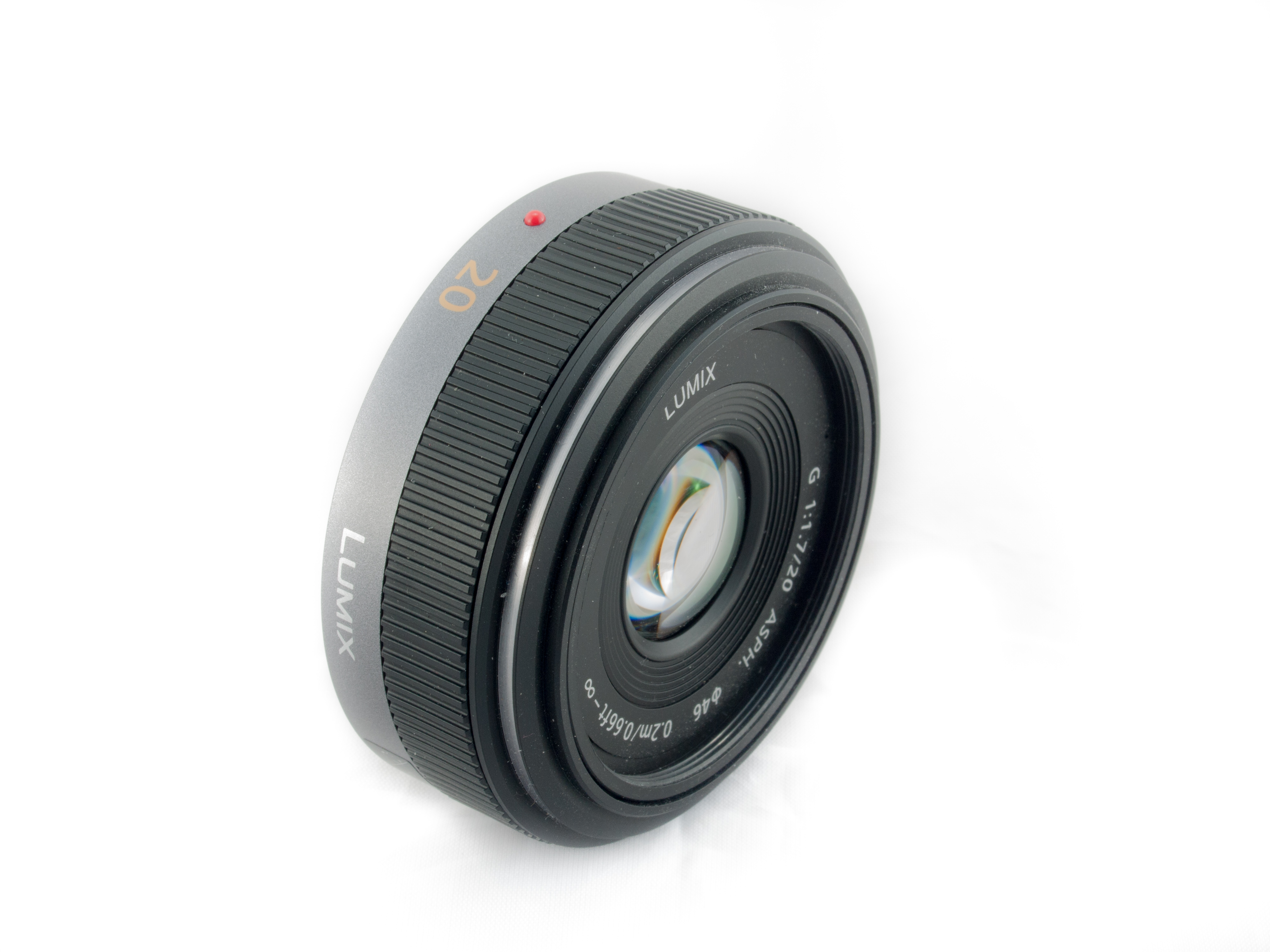
Panasonic Lumix G 20mm f/1.7 Asph.

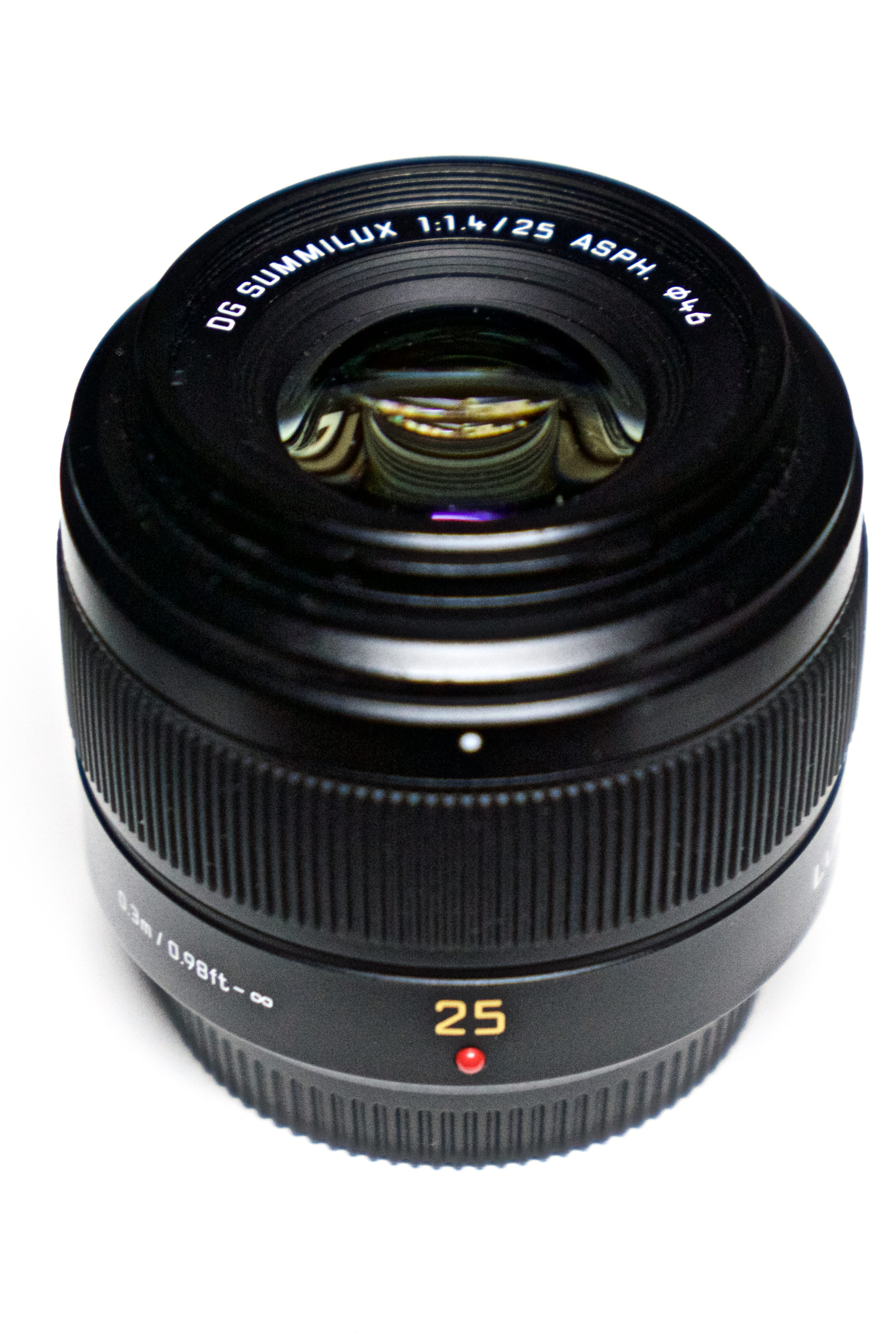
Panasonic Leica DG Summilux 25mm f/1.4 Asph.

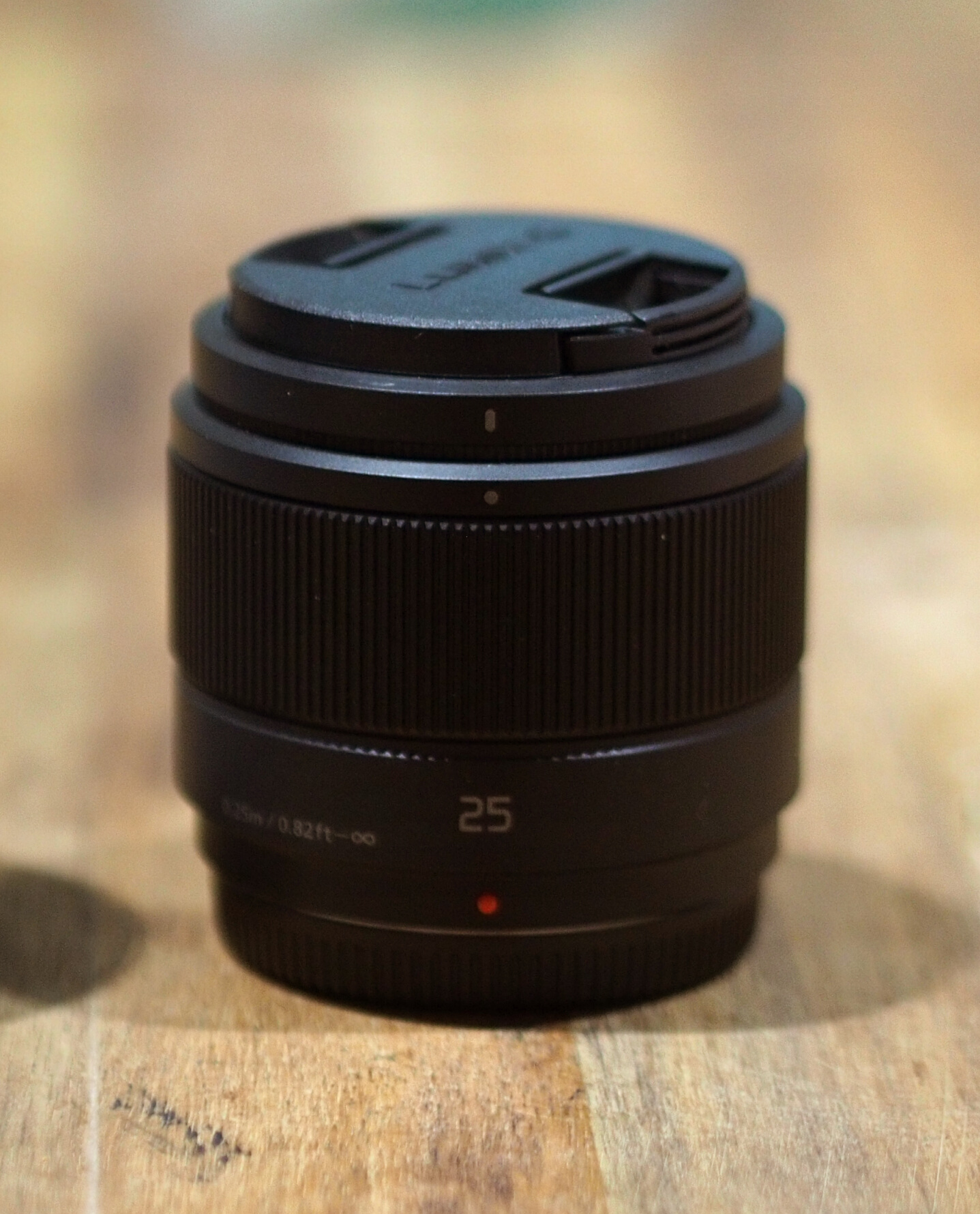
Panasonic Lumix G 25mm f/1.7 Asph.

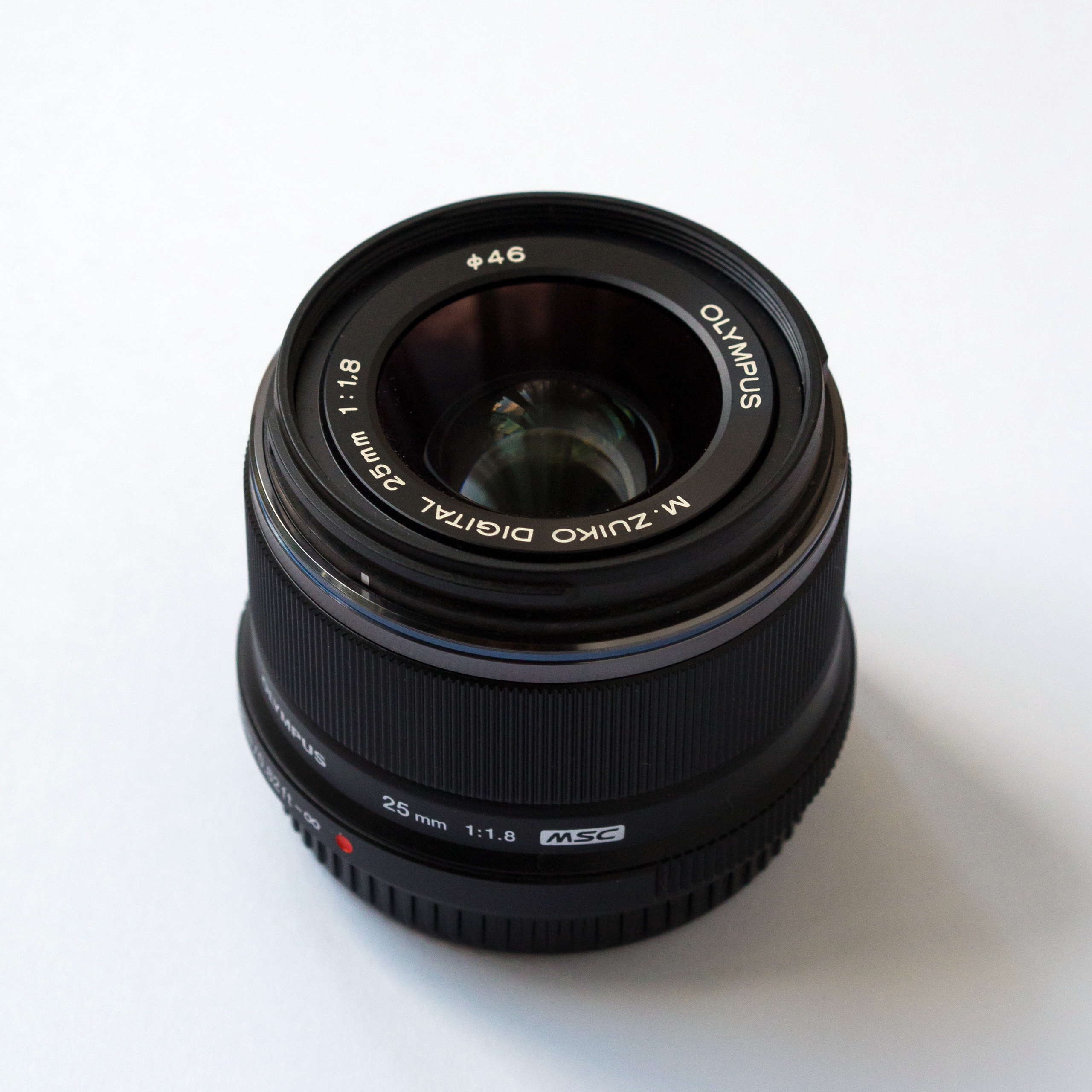
Olympus M.Zuiko Digital 25mm f/1.8

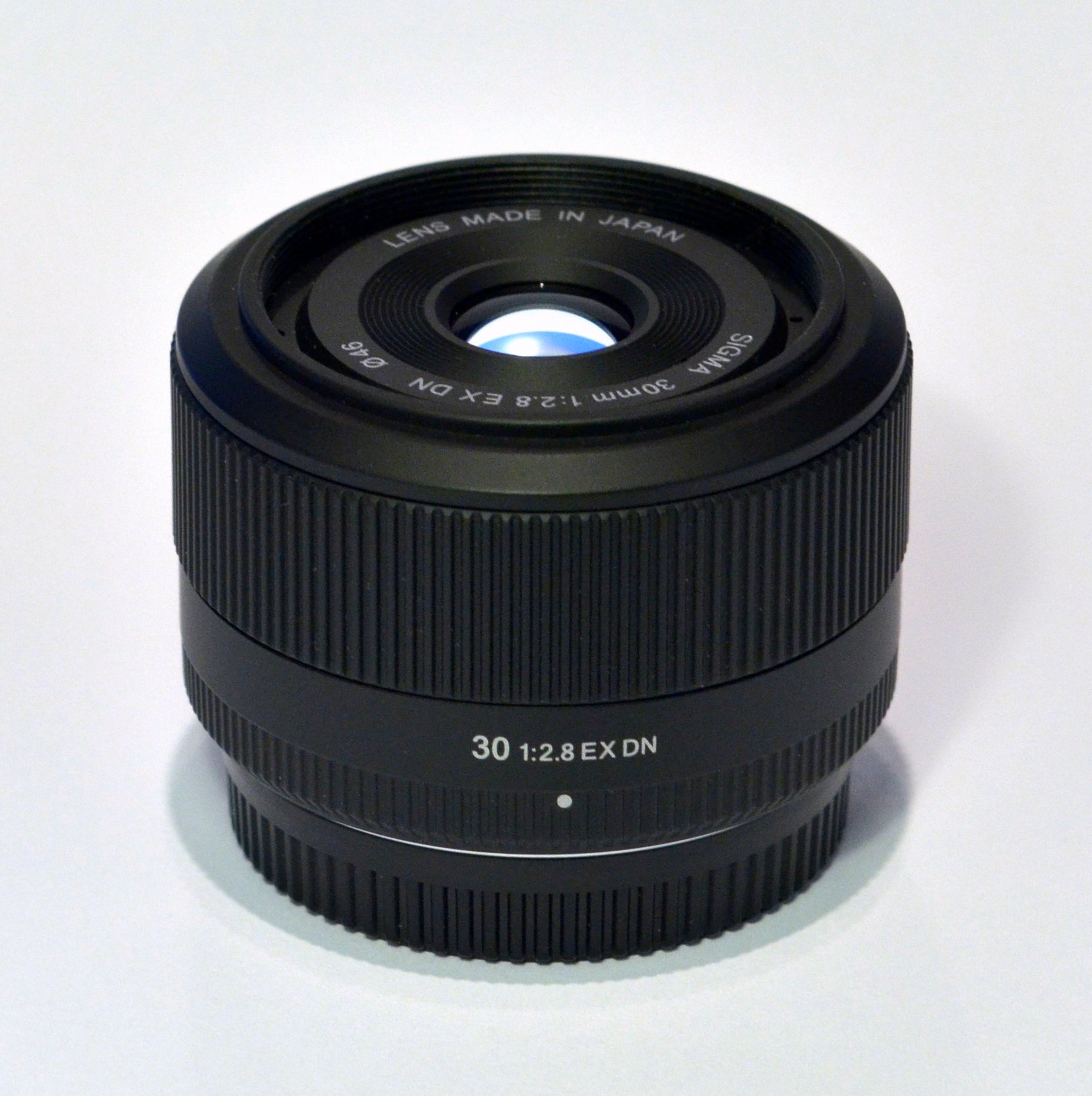
Sigma 30mm f/2.8 EX DN

Standard lenses with autofocus for Micro Four Thirds
| Brand | Product Name | Focal length | 35mm equiv. | Max. Aperture | Filter (mm) | Dims. (Φ×L) | Weight | Constr. | Min. focus (mag.) | Remarks |
|---|---|---|---|---|---|---|---|---|---|---|
| OM System | OM System M.Zuiko Digital ED 20mm f/1.4 PRO | 20mm | 40mm | f/1.4 | 58 | 63.4 mm × 61.7 mm (2.50 in × 2.43 in) | 247 g (8.7 oz) | 11e/10g | 0.25 m (9.8 in) (0.11×) | weather-sealed (announced November 2021) |
| Panasonic | Panasonic Lumix G 20mm f/1.7 Asph. | 20mm | 40mm | f/1.7 | 46 | 63 mm × 25.5 mm (2.48 in × 1.00 in) | 100 g (3.5 oz) | 7e/5g | 0.2 m (7.9 in) (0.13×) | discontinued |
| Panasonic | Panasonic Lumix G 20mm f/1.7 II Asph. | 20mm | 40mm | f/1.7 | 46 | 63 mm × 25.5 mm (2.48 in × 1.00 in) | 87 g (3.1 oz) | 7e/5g | 0.2 m (7.9 in) (0.13×) | (announced 27 June 2013) |
| Olympus | Olympus M.Zuiko Digital ED 25mm f/1.2 PRO | 25mm | 50mm | f/1.2 | 62 | 70 mm × 87 mm (2.8 in × 3.4 in) | 410 g (14 oz) | 19e/14g | 0.3 m (12 in) (0.11×) | (announced 19 September 2016) |
| Olympus | Olympus M.Zuiko Digital 25mm f/1.8 | 25mm | 50mm | f/1.8 | 46 | 57.8 mm × 42 mm (2.28 in × 1.65 in) | 137 g (4.8 oz) | 9e/7g | 0.25 m (9.8 in) (0.12×) | (announced 27 January 2014) |
| Panasonic | Panasonic Leica DG Summilux 25mm f/1.4 Asph. | 25mm | 50mm | f/1.4 | 46 | 63 mm × 54.5 mm (2.48 in × 2.15 in) | 200 g (7.1 oz) | 9e/7g | 0.3 m (12 in) (0.11×) | (announced 13 June 2011) |
| Panasonic | Panasonic Leica DG Summilux 25mm f/1.4 II Asph. | 25mm | 50mm | f/1.4 | 46 | 63 mm × 54.5 mm (2.48 in × 2.15 in) | 205 g (7.2 oz) | 9e/7g | 0.3 m (12 in) (0.11×) | |
| Panasonic | Panasonic Lumix G 25mm f/1.7 Asph. | 25mm | 50mm | f/1.7 | 46 | 60.8 mm × 52 mm (2.39 in × 2.05 in) | 125 g (4.4 oz) | 8e/7g | 0.25 m (9.8 in) (0.14×) | (announced 2 September 2015) |
| YONGNUO | YONGNUO YN25mm f/1.7 | 25mm | 50mm | f/1.7 | 52 | 60.8 mm × 66.6 mm (2.39 in × 2.62 in) | 150 g (5.3 oz) | 7e/6g | 0.2 m (7.9 in) (0.2×) | Price $115 |
| SG-image | SG-image AF 25mm f/1.8 | 25mm | 50mm | f/1.8 | 52 | 67 mm × 31 mm (2.6 in × 1.2 in) | 133 g (4.7 oz) | 7e/5g | 0.3 m (12 in) | Price $125 Released June 2026 |
| Sigma | Sigma 30mm f/1.4 DC DN | Contemporary | 30mm | 60mm | f/1.4 | 52 | 64.8 mm × 72.1 mm (2.55 in × 2.84 in) | 260 g (9.2 oz) | 9e/7g | 0.3 m (12 in) (0.14×) | |
| Sigma | Sigma 30mm f/2.8 DN Art | 30mm | 60mm | f/2.8 | 46 | 60.8 mm × 40.5 mm (2.39 in × 1.59 in) | 140 g (4.9 oz) | 7e/5g | 0.3 m (12 in) (0.12×) | |
| Sigma | Sigma 30mm f/2.8 EX DN | 30mm | 60mm | f/2.8 | 46 | 60.6 mm × 38.6 mm (2.39 in × 1.52 in) | 130 g (4.6 oz) | 7e/5g | 0.3 m (12 in) (0.12×) | discontinued |

=== Autofocus portrait lenses ===
Portrait lenses with autofocus for Micro Four Thirds
| Brand | Product Name | Focal length | 35mm equiv. | Max. Aperture | Filter (mm) | Dims. (Φ×L) | Weight | Constr. | Min. focus (mag.) | Remarks |
|---|---|---|---|---|---|---|---|---|---|---|
| Panasonic | Panasonic Leica DG Nocticron 42.5mm f/1.2 Asph. Power O.I.S. | 42.5mm | 85mm | f/1.2 | 67 | 74 mm × 76.8 mm (2.91 in × 3.02 in) | 425 g (15.0 oz) | 14e/11g | 0.5 m (20 in) (0.1×) | (announced 1 August 2013) |
| Panasonic | Panasonic Lumix G 42.5mm f/1.7 Asph. Power O.I.S. | 42.5mm | 85mm | f/1.7 | 37 | 55 mm × 50 mm (2.2 in × 2.0 in) | 130 g (4.6 oz) | 10e/8g | 0.31 m (12 in) (0.20×) | |
| YONGNUO | YONGNUO YN42.5mm F1.7 | 42.5mm | 85mm | f/1.7 | 52 | 55.4 mm × 61.6 mm (2.18 in × 2.43 in) | 146 g (5.1 oz) | 9e/8g | 0.3 m (12 in) (0.15×) | Price $138 |
| YONGNUO | YONGNUO YN42.5mm F1.7M II | 42.5mm | 85mm | f/1.7 | 52 | 55.4 mm × 61.6 mm (2.18 in × 2.43 in) | 135 g (4.8 oz) | 9e/8g | 0.3 m (12 in) (0.15×) | II version have different case design and focuses much quieter |
| YI | YI Xiaoyi 42.5mm f/1.8 | 42.5mm | 85mm | f/1.8 | 49 | 56.5 mm × 61 mm (2.22 in × 2.40 in) | ? | 6e/6g | 0.25 m (9.8 in) | Has macro mode, no manual-focus ring |
| Olympus | Olympus M.Zuiko Digital 45mm f/1.8 | 45mm | 90mm | f/1.8 | 37 | 56 mm × 46 mm (2.2 in × 1.8 in) | 116 g (4.1 oz) | 9e/8g | 0.5 m (20 in) (0.11×) | |
| Olympus | Olympus M.Zuiko Digital ED 45mm f/1.2 PRO | 45mm | 90mm | f/1.2 | 62 | 70 mm × 84.9 mm (2.76 in × 3.34 in) | 410 g (14 oz) | 14e/10g | 0.5 m (20 in) (0.1×) | (announced 25 October 2017) |
| Sigma | Sigma 56mm f/1.4 DC DN | Contemporary | 56mm | 112mm | f/1.4 | 55 | 66.5 mm × 58.1 mm (2.62 in × 2.29 in) | 265 g (9.3 oz) | 10e/6g | 0.5 m (20 in) (0.13×) | (announced 24 October 2017) |
| Sigma | Sigma 60mm f/2.8 DN Art | 60mm | 120mm | f/2.8 | 46 | 60.8 mm × 55.5 mm (2.39 in × 2.19 in) | 190 g (6.7 oz) | 8e/6g | 0.5 m (20 in) (0.14×) | |
| Olympus | Olympus M.Zuiko Digital ED 75mm f/1.8 | 75mm | 150mm | f/1.8 | 58 | 64 mm × 69 mm (2.5 in × 2.7 in) | 305 g (10.8 oz) | 10e/9g | 0.84 m (33 in) (0.1×) | |

=== Autofocus telephoto lenses ===
Telephoto lenses with autofocus for Micro Four Thirds
| Brand | Product Name | Focal length | 35mm equiv. | Max. Aperture | Filter (mm) | Dims. (Φ×L) | Weight | Constr. | Min. focus (mag.) | Remarks |
|---|---|---|---|---|---|---|---|---|---|---|
| Panasonic | Panasonic Leica DG Elmarit 200mm f/2.8 Power O.I.S. | 200mm | 400mm | f/2.8 | 77 | 87.5 mm × 174 mm (3.44 in × 6.85 in) | 1,245 g (43.9 oz) | 15e/13g | 1.15 m (45 in) (0.2×) | (announced 8 November 2017) |
| Olympus | Olympus M.Zuiko Digital ED 300mm f/4 PRO | 300mm | 600mm | f/4.0 | 77 | 92.5 mm × 227 mm (3.64 in × 8.94 in) | 1,270 g (45 oz) (Note: Without tripod collar. With tripod collar: 1475gr) | 17e/10g | 1.4 m (55 in) (0.24×) | weather-sealed, image stabilization (announced 6 January 2016) |

=== Autofocus macro lenses ===
Autofocus macro lenses for Micro Four Thirds
| Brand | Product Name | Focal length | 35mm equiv. | Max. Aperture | Filter (mm) | Dims. (Φ×L) | Weight | Constr. | Min. focus (mag.) | Remarks |
|---|---|---|---|---|---|---|---|---|---|---|
| Panasonic | Panasonic Lumix G Macro 30mm f/2.8 MEGA O.I.S | 30mm | 60mm | f/2.8 | 46 | 58.8 mm × 63.5 mm (2.31 in × 2.50 in) | 180 g (6.3 oz) | 9e/9g | 0.105 m (4.1 in) (1.0×) | |
| Olympus | Olympus M.Zuiko Digital ED 30mm f/3.5 Macro | 30mm | 60mm | f/3.5 | 46 | 57 mm × 60 mm (2.2 in × 2.4 in) | 128 g (4.5 oz) | 7e/6g | 0.095 m (3.7 in) (1.25×) | |
| Panasonic | Panasonic Leica DG Macro-Elmarit 45mm f/2.8 Asph. | 45mm | 90mm | f/2.8 | 46 | 63 mm × 62.5 mm (2.48 in × 2.46 in) | 225 g (7.9 oz) | 14e/10g | 0.15 m (5.9 in) (1.0×) | |
| Olympus | Olympus M.Zuiko Digital ED 60mm f/2.8 Macro | 60mm | 120mm | f/2.8 | 46 | 56 mm × 82 mm (2.2 in × 3.2 in) | 185 g (6.5 oz) | 13e/10g | 0.19 m (7.5 in) (1.0×) | weather-sealed |
| OM System | OM System M.Zuiko Digital ED 90mm f/3.5 Macro IS PRO | 90mm | 180mm | f/3.5 | 62 | 69.8 mm × 136 mm (2.75 in × 5.35 in) | 453 g (16.0 oz) | 18e/13g | 0.224 m (8.8 in) (2.0×) | weather-sealed IP53. |

=== Autofocus fisheye lenses ===
Autofocus fisheye lenses for Micro Four Thirds
| Brand | Product Name | Focal length | 35mm equiv. | Max. Aperture | Circ. / FF (FoV) | Dims. (Φ×L) | Weight | Constr. | Min. focus (mag.) | Remarks |
|---|---|---|---|---|---|---|---|---|---|---|
| Olympus | Olympus M.Zuiko Digital ED 8mm f/1.8 Fisheye PRO | 8mm | 16mm | f/1.8 | FF (180°) | 62 mm × 80 mm (2.4 in × 3.1 in) | 315 g (11.1 oz) | 17e/15g | 0.12 m (4.7 in) (0.22×) | weather-sealed |
| Panasonic | Panasonic Lumix G Fisheye 8mm f/3.5 | 8mm | 16mm | f/3.5 | FF (180°) | 60.7 mm × 51.7 mm (2.39 in × 2.04 in) | 165 g (5.8 oz) | 10e/9g | 0.1 m (3.9 in) (0.20×) | Rear filter |

== Manual focus prime lenses ==
=== Manual focus ultra wide angle lenses ===
Manual focus ultra wide angle lenses for Micro Four Thirds
| Brand | Product Name | Focal length | 35mm equiv. | Max. Aperture | Filter (mm) | Dims. (Φ×L) | Weight | Constr. | Min. focus (mag.) | Remarks |
|---|---|---|---|---|---|---|---|---|---|---|
| Venus Optics | Laowa 6mm f/2.0 Zero-D | 6mm | 12mm f/4 | f/2.0 | 58 | 61 mm × 52 mm (2.4 in × 2.0 in) | 188 g (6.6 oz) | 13e/9g | 0.09 m (3.5 in) | |
| Venus Optics | Laowa 7.5mm f/2.0 | 7.5mm | 15mm f/4 | f/2.0 | 46 | 50 mm × 55 mm (2.0 in × 2.2 in) | 150–170 g (5.3–6.0 oz) | 13e/9g | 0.12 m (4.7 in) (0.11×) | Rectilinear, (announced 14 Sept 2016) |
| Venus Optics | Laowa 7.5mm f/2.0 | 7.5mm | 15mm f/4 | f/2.0 | 46 | 53 mm × 48 mm (2.1 in × 1.9 in) | 150 g (5.3 oz) | 13e/9g | 0.12 m (4.7 in) (0.11×) | Automatic aperture |
| SLR Magic | SLR Magic 8mm f/4.0 | 8mm | 16mm f/8 | f/4 | —N/a | ? | 110 g (3.9 oz) | 9e/8g | 0.1 m (3.9 in) | |
| Kowa | Kowa Prominar 8.5mm f/2.8 MFT | 8.5mm | 17mm f/5.6 | f/2.8 | 86 | 71.5 mm × 86.8 mm (2.81 in × 3.42 in) | 440 g (16 oz) | 17e/14g | 0.2 m (7.9 in) (0.08×) | Super-wide angle |
| Venus Optics | Laowa 9mm f/2.8 Zero-D | 9mm | 18mm f/5.6 | f/2.8 | 49 | 60 mm × 53 mm (2.4 in × 2.1 in) | 215 g (7.6 oz) | 15e/10g | 0.12 m (4.7 in) | |
| Samyang | Samyang 10mm f/2.8 ED AS NCS CS | 10mm | 20mm f/5.6 | f/2.8 | —N/a | 87 mm × 130.9 mm (3.43 in × 5.15 in) | 620 g (22 oz) | 14e/9g | 0.24 m (9.4 in) | Also sold under Rokinon brand name. Available as cine-focused lens. |
| SLR Magic | SLR Magic 10mm HyperPrime CINE T2.1 | 10mm | 20mm f/4.2 | f/2.1 | 77 | 80 mm × 81 mm (3.1 in × 3.2 in) | 515 g (18.2 oz) | 13e/11g | 0.2 m (7.9 in) | |
| SLR Magic | SLR Magic MicroPrime CINE 10mm T2.1 MFT | 10mm | 20mm f/4.2 | f/2.1 | 82 | ?×87 mm (3.4 in) | 750 g (26 oz) | 13e/11g | 0.20 m (7.9 in) | |
| Venus Optics | Laowa 10mm f/2 Zero-D MFT | 10mm | 20mm f/4 | f/2.0 | 46 | 53 mm × 41 mm (2.1 in × 1.6 in) | 125 g (4.4 oz) | 11e/7g | 0.12 m (4.7 in) | |

=== Manual focus wide angle lenses ===
Manual focus wide angle lenses for Micro Four Thirds
| Brand | Product Name | Focal length | 35mm equiv. | Max. Aperture | Filter (mm) | Dims. (Φ×L) | Weight | Constr. | Min. focus (mag.) | Remarks |
|---|---|---|---|---|---|---|---|---|---|---|
| Cosina Voigtländer | Cosina Voigtländer Nokton 10.5mm f/0.95 | 10.5mm | 21mm f/1.9 | f/0.95 | 72 | 77.0 mm × 82.4 mm (3.03 in × 3.24 in) | 585 g (20.6 oz) | 13e/10g | 0.17 m (6.7 in) (0.12×) | |
| SLR Magic | SLR Magic Toy Lens 11mm f/1.4 | 11mm | 22mm f/2.8 | f/1.4 | ? | ? | ? | ? | ? | |
| 7artisans | 7artisans 12mm f/2.8 MFT | 12mm | 24mm f/5.6 | f/2.8 | 77 (with adapter) | ? | 295 g (10.4 oz) | 10e/8g | 0.2 m (7.9 in) | |
| 7artisans | 7artisans 12mm f/2.8 Mark II | 12mm | 24mm f/5.6 | f/2.8 | 67 | ? | 301 g (10.6 oz) | 12e/10g | 0.15 m (5.9 in) | |
| Kowa | Kowa Prominar 12mm f/1.8 MFT | 12mm | 24mm f/3.6 | f/1.8 | 72 | 76.4 mm × 90.5 mm (3.01 in × 3.56 in) | 475 g (16.8 oz) | 12e/10g | 0.2 m (7.9 in) (0.1×) | |
| Meike | Meike 12mm f/2.0 | 12mm | 24mm f/4.0 | f/2.0 | 62 | ? | 277 g (9.8 oz) | 12e/9g | 0.2 m (7.9 in) | |
| Meike | Meike 12mm f/2.8 | 12mm | 24mm f/5.6 | f/2.8 | 72 | 78 mm × 65.8 mm (3.07 in × 2.59 in) | 360 g (13 oz) | 12e/10g | 0.15 m (5.9 in) | |
| Samyang | Samyang 12mm f/2.0 NCS CS | 12mm | 24mm f/4 | f/2.0 | 67 | 72.5 mm × 57.9 mm (2.85 in × 2.28 in) | 255 g (9.0 oz) | 12e/10g | 0.2 m (7.9 in) | Also sold under Rokinon brand name. Available as cine-focused lens. |
| SLR Magic | SLR Magic HyperPrime CINE 12mm T1.6 | 12mm | 24mm f/3.2 | f/1.6 | 58 | 60 mm × 75 mm (2.4 in × 3.0 in) | 495 g (17.5 oz) | ? | 0.15 m (5.9 in) | |
| Veydra | Veydra Mini Prime 12mm T2.2 | 12mm | 24mm f/4.4 | f/2.2 | 77 | 80 mm (3.1 in)×? | 540 g (1.2 lb) | ? | 0.20 m (8 in) | |
| Samyang | Samyang 14mm f/2.8 ED AS IF UMC | 14mm | 28mm f/5.6 | f/2.8 | —N/a | 87 mm × 120.9 mm (3.43 in × 4.76 in) | 570 g (20 oz) | 14e/10g | 0.28 m (11 in) | |
| Samyang | Samyang 14mm f/2.8 MK2 | 14mm | 28mm f/5.6 | f/2.8 | —N/a | 87 mm × 120.9 mm (3.43 in × 4.76 in) | 692 g (24.4 oz) | 14e/10g | 0.28 m (11 in) (0.08×) | Available as cine-focused lens. |
| Olympus | Olympus 15mm f/8 Body Cap | 15mm | 30mm f/16 | f/8 | —N/a | 56 mm × 9 mm (2.20 in × 0.35 in) | 22 g (0.78 oz) | 3e/3g | 0.3 m (12 in) (0.06×) | Fixed aperture |
| Samyang | Rokinon 16mm f/2.0 ED AS UMC CS | 16mm | 32mm f/4 | f/2.0 | 77 | 83 mm × 114.2 mm (3.27 in × 4.50 in) | 610 g (22 oz) | 13e/11g | 0.2 m (7.9 in) | Available as cine-focused lens. |
| Samyang | Samyang 16mm T2.6 ED AS UMC | 16mm | 32mm | f/2.6 | —N/a | 81.65 mm × 120.9 mm (3.215 in × 4.760 in) | 535 g (18.9 oz) | 14e/11g | 0.3 m (12 in) | Cine-focused lens. |
| Veydra | Veydra Mini Prime 16mm T2.2 | 16mm | 32mm f/4.4 | f/2.2 | 77 | 80 mm (3.1 in)×? | 540 g (1.2 lb) | ? | 0.20 m (8 in) | |
| Mitakon | Mitakon Speedmaster 17mm f/0.95 | 17mm | 34mm f/1.9 | f/0.95 | 58 | 72.7 mm × 65.4 mm (2.86 in × 2.57 in) | 461 g (16.3 oz) | 12e/9g | 0.3 m (12 in) (0.07×) | Also available as T1.0 cine lens. |
| SLR Magic | SLR Magic MicroPrime CINE 17mm T1.5 MFT | 17mm | 34mm | f/1.5 | 82 | ?×87 mm (3.4 in) | 750 g (26 oz) | 9e/8g | 0.18 m (7 in) | |
| SLR Magic | SLR Magic CINE 17mm T1.6 | 17mm | 34mm f/3.2 | f/1.6 | 52 | 60 mm × 81 mm (2.4 in × 3.2 in) | 350 g (12 oz) | ? | 0.17 m (6.7 in) | |
| TTArtisan | TTArtisan 17mm f/1.4 MFT | 17mm | 34mm f/2.8 | f/1.4 | 40.5 | ? | 248 g (8.7 oz) | 9e/8g | 0.2 m (7.9 in) | |
| Venus Optics | Laowa 17mm f/1.8 MFT | 17mm | 34mm f/3.6 | f/1.8 | 46 | 55 mm × 51 mm (2.2 in × 2.0 in) | 172 g (6.1 oz) | 9e/7g | 0.15 m (5.9 in) (0.2×) | |
| Cosina Voigtländer | Cosina Voigtländer Nokton 17.5mm f/0.95 | 17.5mm | 35mm f/1.9 | f/0.95 | 58 | 63.4 mm × 80.0 mm (2.50 in × 3.15 in) | 540 g (19 oz) | 13e/9g | 0.15 m (5.9 in) (0.25×) | |
| 7artisans | 7artisans 18mm f/6.3 UFO MFT | 18mm | 36mm f/12.6 | f/6.3 | —N/a | ? | 51 g (1.8 oz) | ? | 0.35 m (14 in) | |
| 7artisans | 7artisans 18mm f/6.3 Mark II | 18mm | 36mm f/12.6 | f/6.3 | —N/a | 56 mm × 15 mm (2.20 in × 0.59 in) | 49 g (1.7 oz) | 6e/5g | 0.3 m (12 in) | |
| Veydra | Veydra Mini Prime 19mm T2.6 | 19mm | 38mm f/5.2 | f/2.6 | ? | ? | ? | ? | ?0.20 m (8 in) | |

=== Manual focus standard lenses ===
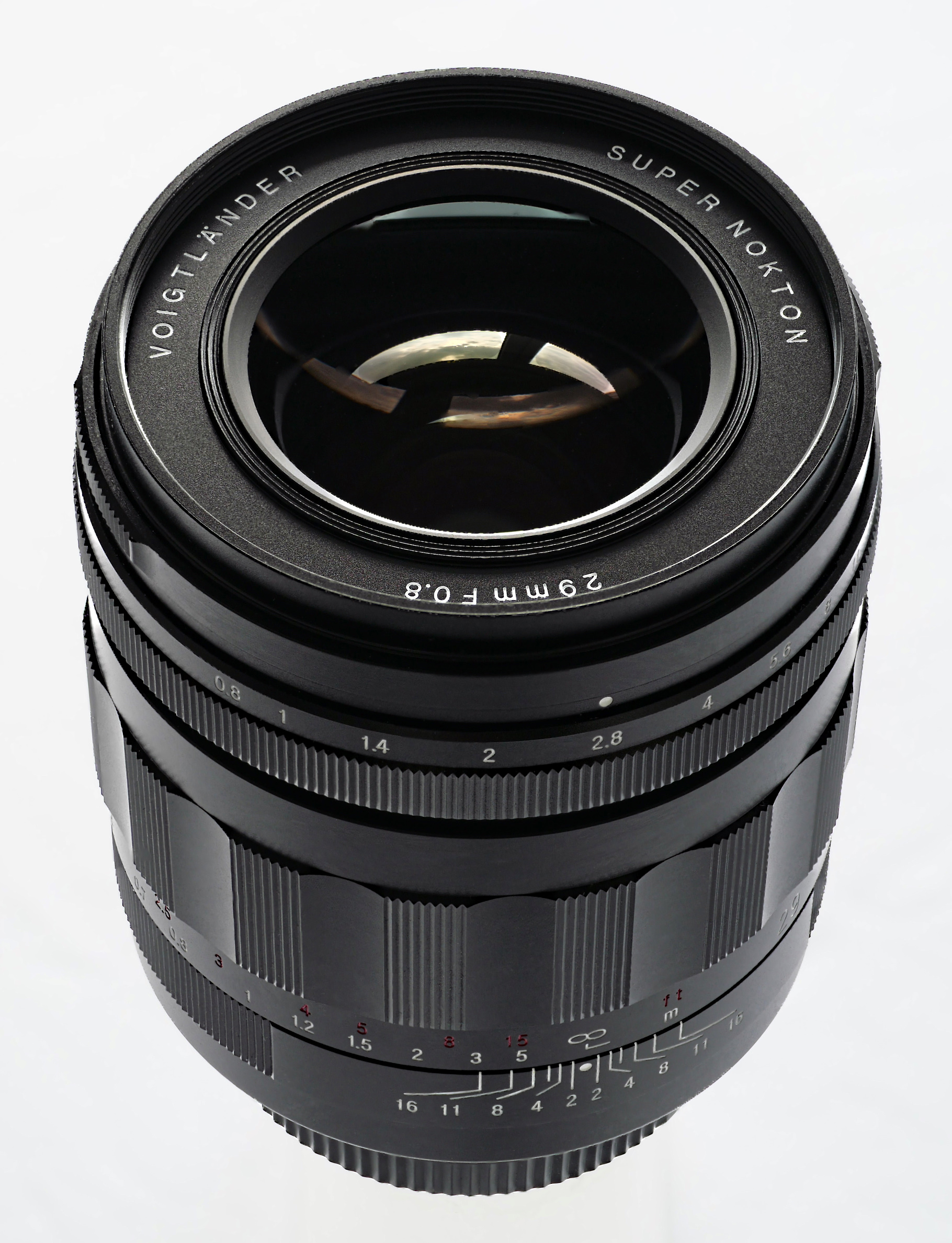
Super Nokton 29 mm F0,8

Manual focus standard lenses for Micro Four Thirds
| Brand | Product Name | Focal length | 35mm equiv. | Max. Aperture | Filter (mm) | Dims. (Φ×L) | Weight | Constr. | Min. focus (mag.) | Remarks |
|---|---|---|---|---|---|---|---|---|---|---|
| Samyang | Samyang 20mm f/1.8 ED AS UMC | 20mm | 40mm f/3.6 | f/1.8 | 77 | 83 mm × 113.2 mm (3.27 in × 4.46 in) | 520 g (18 oz) | 13e/12g | 0.2 m (7.9 in) | Also available as cine-focused lens. |
| Samyang | Rokinon 21mm f/1.4 | 21mm | 42mm f/2.8 | f/1.4 | 58 | 64.3 mm × 66 mm (2.53 in × 2.60 in) | 285 g (10.1 oz) | 8e/7g | 0.28 m (11 in) | Available as cine-focused lens. |
| SLR Magic | SLR Magic MicroPrime CINE 21mm T1.6 MFT | 21mm | 42mm | f/1.6 | 82 | ?×87 mm (3.4 in) | 750 g (26 oz) | 13e/11g | 0.20 m (8 in) | |
| Zonlai | 22mm f/1.8 | 22mm | 44mm f/3.6 | f/1.8 | 46 | 55 mm × 39 mm (2.2 in × 1.5 in) | ? | 8e/7g | 0.1 m (3.9 in) | |
| TTArtisan | APS-C 23mm f/1.4 MFT | 23mm | 46mm f/2.8 | f/1.4 | 43 | ? | 222 g (7.8 oz) | 8e/6g | 0.2 m (7.9 in) | |
| 7artisans | 24mm f/1.4 MFT | 24mm | 48mm | f/1.4 | 49 | 61 mm × 65 mm (2.4 in × 2.6 in) | 344 g (12.1 oz) | 7e/6g | 0.3 m (12 in) | |
| Mitakon | Mitakon Creator 24mm f/1.7 | 24mm | 48mm f/3.4 | f/1.7 | 49 | 61.5 mm × 55 mm (2.42 in × 2.17 in) | 246 g (8.7 oz) | 9e/8g | 0.15 m (5.9 in) | |
| Samyang | Samyang 24mm f/1.4 ED AS IF UMC | 24mm | 48mm f/2.8 | f/1.4 | 77 | 83 mm × 122.3 mm (3.27 in × 4.81 in) | 585 g (20.6 oz) | 13e/12g | 0.25 m (9.8 in) | Also sold under Rokinon brand name. Available as cine-focused lens. |
| Sirui | Sirui 24mm T1.2 Night Walker S35 Cine Lens | 24mm | 48mm T2.4 | T1.2 | 67 | 79 mm × 84.1 mm (3.11 in × 3.31 in) | 500 g (18 oz) | 12e/11g | 0.3 m (12 in) | |
| Sirui | Sirui 24mm f/2.8 Anamorphic 1.33x | 24mm | 48mm f/5.6 | f/2.8 | 72 | 74 mm × 124.9 mm (2.91 in × 4.92 in) | 770 g (27 oz) | 13e/10g | 0.6 m (24 in) | (announced 16 September 2019) |
| 7artisans | 25mm f/0.95 MFT | 25mm | 50mm | f/0.95 | 52 | 63 mm × 99.7 mm (2.48 in × 3.93 in) | 582 g (20.5 oz) | 11e/9g | 0.25 m (9.8 in) | |
| 7artisans | 25mm f/1.8 MFT | 25mm | 50mm f/3.6 | f/1.8 | 46 | 59.9 mm × 37.8 mm (2.36 in × 1.49 in) | 143 g (5.0 oz) | 7e/5g | 0.18 m (7.1 in) | Available in Black or Gold/Silver |
| Cosina Voigtländer | Cosina Voigtländer Nokton 25mm f/0.95 | 25mm | 50mm f/1.9 | f/0.95 | 52 | 58.4 mm × 70 mm (2.30 in × 2.76 in) | 410 g (14 oz) | 11e/8g | 0.17 m (6.7 in) (0.26×) | |
| Cosina Voigtländer | Cosina Voigtländer Nokton 25mm f/0.95 Type II | 25mm | 50mm f/1.9 | f/0.95 | 52 | 60.6 mm × 70.0 mm (2.39 in × 2.76 in) | 435 g (15.3 oz) | 11e/8g | 0.17 m (6.7 in) (0.26×) | |
| Kowa | Kowa Prominar 25mm f/1.8 MFT | 25mm | 50mm f/3.6 | f/1.8 | 55 | 60 mm × 94 mm (2.4 in × 3.7 in) | 400 g (14 oz) | 8e/6g | 0.25 m (9.8 in) (0.15×) | |
| Meike | Meike 25mm f/0.95 | 25mm | 50mm f/1.8 | f/0.95 | 62 | ? | 600 g (21 oz) | 11e/9g | 0.25 m (9.8 in) | |
| Meike | Meike 25mm f/1.8 | 25mm | 50mm f/3.6 | f/1.8 | 49 | 60.5 mm × 40.9 mm (2.38 in × 1.61 in) | 190 g (6.7 oz) | 7e/5g | 0.25 m (9.8 in) | |
| Meike | Meike 25mm f/2.0 | 25mm | 50mm f/4.0 | f/2.0 | 55 | 62 mm × 83.4 mm (2.44 in × 3.28 in) | 448 g (15.8 oz) | 10e/8g | 0.25 m (9.8 in) | |
| Mitakon | Mitakon Speedmaster 25mm f/0.95 | 25mm | 50mm f/1.9 | f/0.95 | 43 | 60 mm × 45 mm (2.4 in × 1.8 in) | 230 g (8.1 oz) | 11e/9g | 0.3 m (12 in) (0.13×) | Also available as T1.0 cine lens. |
| SLR Magic | SLR Magic HyperPrime CINE II 25mm T0.95 | 25mm | 50mm f/1.9 | f/0.95 | 49 | 60 mm × 75 mm (2.4 in × 3.0 in) | 440 g (16 oz) | ? | 0.26 m (10 in) | |
| SLR Magic | SLR Magic HyperPrime CINE III 25mm T0.95 | 25mm | 50mm f/1.9 | f/0.95 | 52 | ? | 500 g (18 oz) | 11e/9g | 0.26 m (10 in) | |
| SLR Magic | SLR Magic MicroPrime CINE 25mm T1.5 MFT | 25mm | 50mm | f/1.5 | 82 | ?×87 mm (3.4 in) | 750 g (26 oz) | 11e/9g | 0.36 m (14 in) | |
| Veydra | Mini Prime 25mm T2.2 | 25mm | 50mm f/4.4 | f/2.2 | 77 | ? | 500 g (1.1 lb) | ? | 0.25 m (10 in) | |
| Zonlai | 25mm f/1.8 | 25mm | 50mm f/3.6 | f/1.8 | 46 | 55 mm × 33 mm (2.2 in × 1.3 in) | 140 g (4.9 oz) | 7e/5g | 0.18 m (7.1 in) | |
| SLR Magic | SLR Magic Toy Lens 26mm f/1.4 | 26mm | 52mm f/2.8 | f/1.4 | ? | 37 mm × 39 mm (1.5 in × 1.5 in) | 80 g (2.8 oz) | ? | ? | |
| Lensbaby | Velvet 28mm f/2.5 | 28mm | 56mm f/5 | f/2.5 | 67 | ? | 454 g (16.0 oz) | 8e/7g | 0.049 m (1.9 in) | |
| Meike | Meike 28mm f/2.8 | 28mm | 56mm f/5.6 | f/2.8 | 49 | ?×51.5 mm (2.03 in) | 200 g (7.1 oz) | 6e/5g | 0.25 m (9.8 in) | |
| SLR Magic | SLR Magic Toy Lens 28mm Bokehmorphic | 28mm | 56mm | ? | ? | ? | ? | ? | ? | |
| Cosina Voigtländer | Cosina Voigtländer Super Nokton 29mm f/0.8 | 29mm | 58mm f/1.6 | f/0.8 | 62 | 72.3 mm × 88.9 mm (2.85 in × 3.50 in) | 703 g (24.8 oz) | 11e/7g | 0.37 m (15 in) (0.10×) | |
| Meyer Optik Görlitz | Lydith 30 f3.5 II | 30mm | 60mm | f/3.5 | 52 | ?×71 mm (2.8 in) | 270 g (9.5 oz) | 5e/4g | 0.15 m (5.9 in) | |

=== Manual focus portrait lenses ===
Manual focus portrait lenses for Micro Four Thirds
| Brand | Product Name | Focal length | 35mm equiv. | Max. Aperture | Filter (mm) | Dims. (Φ×L) | Weight | Constr. | Min. focus (mag.) | Remarks |
|---|---|---|---|---|---|---|---|---|---|---|
| Jackar | Jackar SnapShooter 34mm f/1.8 | 34mm | 68mm f/3,6 | f/1.8 | 37 | 53 mm × 48 mm (2.1 in × 1.9 in) | 145 g (5.1 oz) | ? | 0.30 m (12 in) | |
| 7artisans | 7artisans 35mm f/0.95 MFT | 35mm | 70mm f/1.9 | f/0.95 | 52 | 56 mm × 63 mm (2.2 in × 2.5 in) | 369 g (13.0 oz) | 11e/8g | 0.37 m (15 in) | Ultra-bright maximum aperture |
| 7artisans | 7artisans 35mm T1.05 | 35mm | 70mm f/2.1 | f/1.05 | 82 | 89.6 mm × 85 mm (3.53 in × 3.35 in) | 753 g (26.6 oz) | 11e/8g | 0.37 m (15 in) | |
| 7artisans | 7artisans 35mm f/1.2 MFT | 35mm | 70mm f/2.4 | f/1.2 | ? | ? | ? | 6e/5g | ? | |
| 7artisans | 7artisans 35mm f/1.2 MFT Mark II | 35mm | 70mm f/2.4 | f/1.2 | 46 | 51 mm × 32 mm (2.0 in × 1.3 in) | 218 g (7.7 oz) | 6e/5g | 0.35 m (14 in) | Available in Black or Silver |
| 7artisans | 7artisans 35mm f/1.4 MFT | 35mm | 70mm f/2.8 | f/1.4 | 52 | ? | 228 g (8.0 oz) | 8e/5g | 0.35 m (14 in) | Available in Black or Silver |
| Meike | Meike 35mm f/0.95 | 35mm | 70mm f/1.9 | f/0.95 | 52 | ? | 380 g (13 oz) | 10e/7g | 0.39 m (15 in) | |
| Meike | Meike 35mm f/1.4 | 35mm | 70mm f/2.8 | f/1.4 | 49 | ?×66 mm (2.6 in) | 190 g (6.7 oz) | 8e/5g | 0.4 m (16 in) | |
| Meike | Meike 35mm f/1.7 | 35mm | 70mm f/3.4 | f/1.7 | 49 | 60.5 mm × 41 mm (2.38 in × 1.61 in) | 176 g (6.2 oz) | 6e/5g | ? (0.113×) | |
| Meyer Optik Görlitz | Nocturnus 35mm f/0.95 | 35mm | 70mm f/1.9 | f/0.95 | ? | ? | 680 g (24 oz) | 10e/7g | 0.3 m (12 in) | Rebranded Mitakon Speedmaster, confirmed in 2019. |
| Mitakon | Mitakon Speedmaster 35mm f/0.95 | 35mm | 70mm f/1.9 | f/0.95 | 55 | 63 mm × 60 mm (2.5 in × 2.4 in) | 460 g (16 oz) | 11e/8g | 0.35 m (14 in) (0.13×) | Also available as T1.0 cine lens. |
| Samyang | Samyang 35mm f/1.2 ED AS UMC CS | 35mm | 70mm f/2.4 | f/1.2 | 62 | 67.5 mm × 73 mm (2.66 in × 2.87 in) | 420 g (15 oz) | 9e/7g | 0.38 m (15 in) | Cine version available. |
| Samyang | Samyang 35mm f/1.4 AS UMC | 35mm | 70mm f/2.8 | f/1.4 | 77 | 83 mm × 136.3 mm (3.27 in × 5.37 in) | 730 g (26 oz) | 12e/11g | 0.3 m (12 in) | Also sold under Rokinon brand name. |
| Samyang | Samyang 35mm T1.5 VDSLR AS UMC II | 35mm | 70mm | f/1.5 | 77 | 83 mm × 136.3 mm (3.27 in × 5.37 in) | 735 g (25.9 oz) | 12e/10g | 0.3 m (12 in) | Cine-focused lens. |
| Sirui | Sirui 35mm T1.2 Night Walker S35 Cine Lens | 35mm | 70mm T2.4 | T1.2 | 67 | 79 mm × 84.1 mm (3.11 in × 3.31 in) | 510 g (18 oz) | 11e/10g | 0.3 m (12 in) | |
| Sirui | Sirui 35mm f/1.8 Anamorphic 1.33x | 35mm | 70mm f/3.6 | f/1.8 | 67 | 71 mm × 117 mm (2.8 in × 4.6 in) | 700 g (25 oz) | 13e/9g | 0.85 m (33 in) | (announced 7 July 2020) |
| SLR Magic | SLR Magic HyperPrime CINE II 35mm T0.95 | 35mm | 70mm f/1.9 | f/0.95 | 62 | 72 mm × 95 mm (2.8 in × 3.7 in) | 715 g (25.2 oz) | ? | 0.33 m (13 in) | APS-H Leica M mount lens with adapter |
| SLR Magic | SLR Magic HyperPrime CINE II 35mm T1.4 | 35mm | 70mm f/2.8 | f/1.4 | 52 | 62 mm × 70 mm (2.4 in × 2.8 in) | 390 g (14 oz) | ? | 0.33 m (13 in) | |
| SLR Magic | SLR Magic MicroPrime CINE 35mm T1.5 MFT | 35mm | 70mm | f/1.5 | 82 | ?×87 mm (3.4 in) | 750 g (26 oz) | 9e/8g | 0.38 m (15 in) | |
| SLR Magic | SLR Magic 35mm f/1.7 | 35mm | 70mm f/3.4 | f/1.7 | 37 | 44 mm × 39 mm (1.7 in × 1.5 in) | 110 g (3.9 oz) | ? | 0.3 m (12 in) | |
| SLR Magic | SLR Magic 2x Anamorphot CINE 35mm T2.4 | 35mm | 70mm f/4.8 | f/2.4 | 82 | ?×192.5 mm (7.58 in) | 1,400 g (49 oz) | 11e/10g | 1.0 m (41 in) | |
| TTArtisan | TTArtisan 35mm f/1.4 MFT | 35mm | 70mm f/2.8 | f/1.4 | 39 | ? | 180 g (6.3 oz) | 7e/6g | 0.28 m (11 in) | |
| Veydra | Veydra Mini Prime 35mm T2.2 | 35mm | 70mm f/4.4 | f/2.2 | 77 | 80 mm (3.1 in)×? | 880 g (1.94 lb) | ? | 0.28 m (11 in) | |
| Zonlai | Zonlai 35mm f/1.6 | 35mm | 70mm f/3,2 | f/1.6 | 49 | 56 mm × 38 mm (2.2 in × 1.5 in) | 210 g (7.4 oz) | 6e/4g | 0.27 m (11 in) | |
| Zonlai | Zonlai 35mm f/1.8 | 35mm | 70m f/3,6 | f/1.8 | 46 | 49 mm × 33 mm (1.9 in × 1.3 in) | 140 g (4.9 oz) | 6e/4g | 0.3 m (12 in) | |
| Kipon | Handevision Ibelux 40mm f/0.85 | 40mm | 80mm f/1.7 | f/0.85 | 67 | 74 mm × 128 mm (2.9 in × 5.0 in) | 1,150 g (41 oz) | 10e/8g | 0.75 m (2 ft 6 in) (0.05×) | Designed by IB/E Optics, produced by Shanghai Transvision (Kipon). |
| Cosina Voigtländer | Cosina Voigtländer Nokton 42.5mm f/0.95 | 42.5mm | 85mm f/1.9 | f/0.95 | 58 | 64.3 mm × 74.6 mm (2.53 in × 2.94 in) | 571 g (20.1 oz) | 11e/8g | 0.3 m (12 in) (0.25×) | |
| Mitakon | Mitakon Speedmaster 42.5mm f/1.2 | 42.5mm | 85mm f/2.4 | f/1.2 | 49 | 60 mm × 52.5 mm (2.36 in × 2.07 in) | 310 g (11 oz) | 9e/7g | 0.45 m (18 in) | |
| 7artisans | 7artisans 50mm f/0.95 MFT | 50mm | 100mm f/1.9 | f/0.95 | 62 | 64 mm × 58 mm (2.5 in × 2.3 in) | 416 g (14.7 oz) | 7e/5g | 0.45 m (18 in) | Ultra-bright maximum aperture |
| 7artisans | 7artisans 50mm T1.05 | 50mm | 100mm f/2.1 | f/1.05 | 82 | 89.6 mm × 85.4 mm (3.53 in × 3.36 in) | 679 g (24.0 oz) | 7e/5g | 0.5 m (20 in) | |
| 7artisans | 7artisans 50mm f/1.8 MFT | 50mm | 100mm f/3.6 | f/1.8 | 52 | 55 mm × 40 mm (2.2 in × 1.6 in) | 168 g (5.9 oz) | 6e/5g | 0.5 m (20 in) | |
| Meike | Meike 50mm f/0.95 | 50mm | 100mm f/1.9 | f/0.95 | 62 | ? | 420 g (15 oz) | 7e/5g | 0.45 m (18 in) | |
| Meike | Meike 50mm f/2.0 | 50mm | 100mm f/4.0 | f/2.0 | 49 | 60.5 mm × 41 mm (2.38 in × 1.61 in) | 188 g (6.6 oz) | 6e/5g | ? (0.08×) | |
| Meyer Optik Görlitz | Trioplan 50 f2.8 II | 50mm | 100mm | f/2.8 | 52 | ?×61 mm (2.4 in) | 240 g (8.5 oz) | 3e | 0.5 m (20 in) | |
| Mitakon | Mitakon Speedmaster 50mm T1.0 | 50mm | 100mm | f/1.0 | 77 | 80 mm × 102 mm (3.1 in × 4.0 in) | 720 g (25 oz) | 9e/6g | 0.6 m (24 in) (0.10×) | Available exclusively as T1.0 cine lens. |
| Samyang | Rokinon 50mm f/1.2 | 50mm | 100mm f/2.4 | f/1.2 | 62 | 67.5 mm × 73 mm (2.66 in × 2.87 in) | 385 g (13.6 oz) | 9e/7g | 0.5 m (20 in) | Cine version available. |
| Samyang | Samyang 50mm f/1.4 AS UMC | 50mm | 100mm f/2.8 | f/1.4 | 77 | 81.6 mm × 99.5 mm (3.21 in × 3.92 in) | 555 g (19.6 oz) | 9e/6g | 0.45 m (18 in) | Available as cine-focused lens. |
| Sirui | Sirui 50mm f/1.8 Anamorphic 1.33x | 50mm | 100mm f/3.6 | f/1.8 | 67 | 69.2 mm × 106.6 mm (2.72 in × 4.20 in) | 560 g (20 oz) | 11e/8g | 0.85 m (33 in) | (announced 16 September 2019) |
| SLR Magic | SLR Magic HyperPrime CINE 50mm f/0.95 | 50mm | 100mm f/1.9 | f/0.95 | 62 | 74 mm × 95 mm (2.9 in × 3.7 in) | 975 g (34.4 oz) | ? | 0.7 m (28 in) | Leica M mount |
| SLR Magic | SLR Magic HyperPrime 50mm f/0.95 | 50mm | 100mm f/1.9 | f/0.95 | 62 | ?×80 mm (3.1 in) | 480–640 g (17–23 oz) | 10e/7g | 0.5–0.6 m (20–24 in) | |
| SLR Magic | SLR Magic MicroPrime CINE 50mm T1.4 MFT | 50mm | 100mm | f/1.4 | 82 | ?×87 mm (3.4 in) | 750 g (26 oz) | 6e/5g | 0.53 m (21 in) | |
| SLR Magic | SLR Magic APO-HyperPrime CINE 50mm T2.1 | 50mm | 100mm f/4.2 | f/2.1 | 62 | 97 mm × 94 mm (3.8 in × 3.7 in) | 1,100 g (39 oz) | ? | 0.61 m (24 in) | PL mount |
| SLR Magic | SLR Magic 2x Anamorphot-CINE 50mm T2.8 | 50mm | 100mm f/5.6 | f/2.8 | 82 | ?×192.5 mm (7.58 in) | 1,400 g (49 oz) | 11e/10g | 1.0 m (41 in) | |
| TTArtisan | TTArtisan 50mm f/0.95 MFT | 50mm | 100mm f/1.9 | f/0.95 | 58 | ? | 411 g (14.5 oz) | 8e/6g | 0.5 m (20 in) | |
| TTArtisan | TTArtisan 50mm f/1.2 MFT | 50mm | 100mm f/2.4 | f/1.2 | 52 | ? | 336 g (11.9 oz) | 7e/5g | 0.5 m (20 in) | Very bright maximum aperture |
| Veydra | Veydra Mini Prime 50mm T2.2 | 50mm | 100mm f/4.4 | f/2.2 | 77 | 80 mm (3.1 in)×? | 460 g (1.02 lb) | ? | 0.38 m (15 in) | |
| Zonlai | Zonlai 50mm f/1.4 | 50mm | 100m f/2,8 | f/1.4 | 49 | 55 mm × 45 mm (2.2 in × 1.8 in) | 195 g (6.9 oz) | 6e/6g | 0.45 m (18 in) | |
| 7artisans | 7artisans 55mm f/1.4 MFT | 55mm | 110mm f/2.8 | f/1.4 | 55 | ? | 358 g (12.6 oz) | 6e/5g | 0.42 m (17 in) | Available in Black or Silver |
| Sirui | Sirui 55mm T1.2 Night Walker S35 Cine Lens | 55mm | 110mm T2.4 | T1.2 | 67 | 79 mm × 84.1 mm (3.11 in × 3.31 in) | 570 g (20 oz) | 11e/10g | 0.3 m (12 in) | |
| Lensbaby | Lensbaby Velvet 56mm f/1.6 | 56mm | 112mm f/3.2 | f/1.6 | 62 | ? | 410 g (14 oz) | 4e/3g | 0.13 m (5.1 in) | |
| Meyer Optik Görlitz | Biotar 58 f1.5 II | 58mm | 116mm | f/1.5 | 52 | ?×95 mm (3.7 in) | 445 g (15.7 oz) | 6e/4g | 0.7 m (28 in) | |
| Meyer Optik Görlitz | Primoplan 58 f1.9 II | 58mm | 116mm | f/1.9 | 52 | ?×71 mm (2.8 in) | 270 g (9.5 oz) | 5e/4g | 0.5 m (20 in) | |
| Cosina Voigtländer | Cosina Voigtländer Nokton 60mm f/0.95 | 60mm | 120mm f/1.9 | f/0.95 | 77 | 82.5 mm × 87.7 mm (3.25 in × 3.45 in) | 860 g (30 oz) | 11e/8g | 0.34 m (13 in) (0.25×) | |
| SLR Magic | SLR Magic 2x Anamorphot-CINE 70mm T4 | 70mm | 140mm f/8 | f/4 | 82 | ?×192.5 mm (7.58 in) | 1,400 g (49 oz) | 11e/10g | 1.0 m (41 in) | |

=== Manual focus telephoto lenses ===
Manual focus telephoto lenses for Micro Four Thirds
| Brand | Product Name | Focal length | 35mm equiv. | Max. Aperture | Filter (mm) | Dims. (Φ×L) | Weight | Constr. | Min. focus (mag.) | Remarks |
|---|---|---|---|---|---|---|---|---|---|---|
| Meyer Optik Görlitz | Biotar 75 f1.5 II | 75mm | 150mm | f/1.5 | 52 | ?×95 mm (3.7 in) | 650 g (23 oz) | 6e/4g | 0.75 m (30 in) | |
| Meyer Optik Görlitz | Primoplan 75 f1.9 II | 75mm | 150mm | f/1.9 | 52 | ?×85 mm (3.3 in) | 360 g (13 oz) | 5e/4g | 0.75 m (30 in) | |
| Sirui | Sirui 75mm f/1.8 Anamorphic 1.33x | 75mm | 150mm f/3.6 | f/1.8 | 67 | 73 mm × 130.4 mm (2.87 in × 5.13 in) | 795 g (28.0 oz) | 16e/12g | 2.3 m (91 in) | (announced 16 September 2019) |
| Lensbaby | Lensbaby Velvet 85mm f/1.8 | 85mm | 170mm f/3.6 | f/1.8 | 67 | ? | 530 g (19 oz) | 4e/3g | 0.23 m (9.1 in) | |
| Samyang | Rokinon 85mm f/1.4 AS IF UMC | 85mm | 170mm f/2.8 | f/1.4 | 72 | 78 mm × 99.5 mm (3.07 in × 3.92 in) | 565 g (19.9 oz) | 9e/7g | 1.1 m (43 in) | |
| Samyang | Rokinon 85mm f/1.4 MK2 | 85mm | 170mm f/2.8 | f/1.4 | 72 | 78 mm × 99.5 mm (3.07 in × 3.92 in) | 587 g (20.7 oz) | 9e/7g | 1.1 m (43 in) (0.09×) | Available as cine-focused lens. |
| Samyang | Samyang 85mm f/1.8 ED UMC CS | 85mm | 170mm f/3.2 | f/1.8 | 62 | 67.5 mm × 79.5 mm (2.66 in × 3.13 in) | 356 g (12.6 oz) | 9e/7g | 0.65 m (26 in) (0.17×) | |
| Veydra | Veydra Mini Prime 85mm T2.2 | 85mm | 170mm f/4.4 | f/2.2 | ? | ? | ? | ? | ? | (announced 12 April 2015) |
| Samyang | Samyang 100mm f/2.8 ED UMC MACRO | 100mm | 200mm f/5.6 | f/2.8 | 67 | 72.5 mm × 147.9 mm (2.85 in × 5.82 in) | 725 g (25.6 oz) | 15e/12g | 0.30 m (12 in) | Available as cine-focused lens. |
| Samyang | Rokinon 135mm f/2.0 ED UMC | 135mm | 270mm f/4 | f/2.0 | 77 | 82 mm × 146.9 mm (3.23 in × 5.78 in) | 835 g (29.5 oz) | 11e/7g | 0.8 m (31 in) | Available as cine-focused lens. |
| Tokina | Tokina Reflex 300mm f/6.3 MF Macro | 300mm | 600mm f/12.6 | f/6.3 | 55 | 66 mm × 66 mm (2.6 in × 2.6 in) | 298 g (10.5 oz) | 7e/3g | 0.8 m (31 in) (0.5×) | Reflex lens |
| Samyang | Rokinon Reflex 300mm f/6.3 ED UMC CS | 300mm | 600mm f/12.6 | f/6.3 | 25.5 (rear) | 64.5 mm × 72.6 mm (2.54 in × 2.86 in) | 310 g (11 oz) | 9e/9g | 0.9 m (35 in) | |
| Kodak | Kodak Pixpro SF 400mm f/6.7 Fieldscope | 400mm | 800mm f/13,4 | f/6.7 | ? | 80 mm × 286 mm (3.1 in × 11.3 in) | 640 g (23 oz) | 5e/3g | 9 m (350 in) | |

=== Manual focus macro lenses ===
Manual focus macro lenses for Micro Four Thirds
| Brand | Product Name | Focal length | 35mm equiv. | Max. Aperture | Filter (mm) | Dims. (Φ×L) | Weight | Constr. | Min. focus (mag.) | Remarks |
|---|---|---|---|---|---|---|---|---|---|---|
| Mitakon | Mitakon Creator 20mm f/2 4-4.5x | 20mm | 40mm | f/2 | —N/a | 62 mm × 60 mm (2.4 in × 2.4 in) | 230 g (8.1 oz) | 6e/4g | 0.02 m (0.79 in) (4.5×) | |
| TTArtisan | TTArtisan 40mm f/2.8 Macro MFT | 40mm | 80mm | f/2.8 | 52 | ? | 371 g (13.1 oz) | 8e/7g | 0.17 m (6.7 in) (1.0×) | |
| Venus Optics | Laowa 50mm f/2.8 2X Ultra Macro APO | 50mm | 100mm | f/2.8 | 49 | 53.5 mm × 79 mm (2.11 in × 3.11 in) | 240 g (8.5 oz) | 14e/10g | 0.135 m (5.3 in) (2.0×) | (announced 17 August 2020) |
| ~~Schneider Kreuznach~~ | ~~Schneider Kreuznach Makro-Symmar 60mm f/2.4~~ | ~~60mm~~ | ~~120mm~~ | ~~f/2.4~~ | ? | ? | ? | ? | ? | ~~(announced 28 September 2012)~~ never produced |
| 7artisans | 7artisans 60mm f/2.8 Macro MFT | 60mm | 120mm | f/2.8 | ? | ? | 550 g (19 oz) | 8e/7g | 0.26 m (10 in) (1.0×) | |
| 7artisans | 7artisans 60mm f/2.8 Macro MFT II | 60mm | 120mm | f/2.8 | 49 | 60 mm × 80.5 mm (2.36 in × 3.17 in) | 339 g (12.0 oz) | 11e/8g | 0.175 m (6.9 in) (1.0×) | |
| Meike | Meike 60mm F2.8 APS-C Manual Focus Macro | 60mm | 120mm | f/2.8 | 49 | ? | 300 g (11 oz) | 11e/8g | 0.175 m (6.9 in) (1.0×) | |
| Meike | Meike 85mm f/2.8 Manual Focus Macro | 85mm | 170mm | f/2.8 | 55 | 64 mm × 91.5 mm (2.52 in × 3.60 in) | 500 g (18 oz) | 11e/8g | 0.25 m (9.8 in) (1.5×) | |
| Mitakon | Mitakon Creator 85mm f/2.8 1-5X Super Macro | 85mm | 170mm | f/2.8 | 58 | 67 mm × 122 mm (2.6 in × 4.8 in) | 750 g (26 oz) | 12e/8g | 0.1 m (3.9 in) (5.0×) | |
| Yasuhara | Yasuhara Nanoha x5 f/11 Macro | —N/a | —N/a | f/11 | —N/a | 61 mm × 84 mm (2.4 in × 3.3 in) | 310 g (11 oz) | 10e/7g | 0.019 m (0.75 in) (5.0×) | |

=== Manual focus fisheye lenses ===
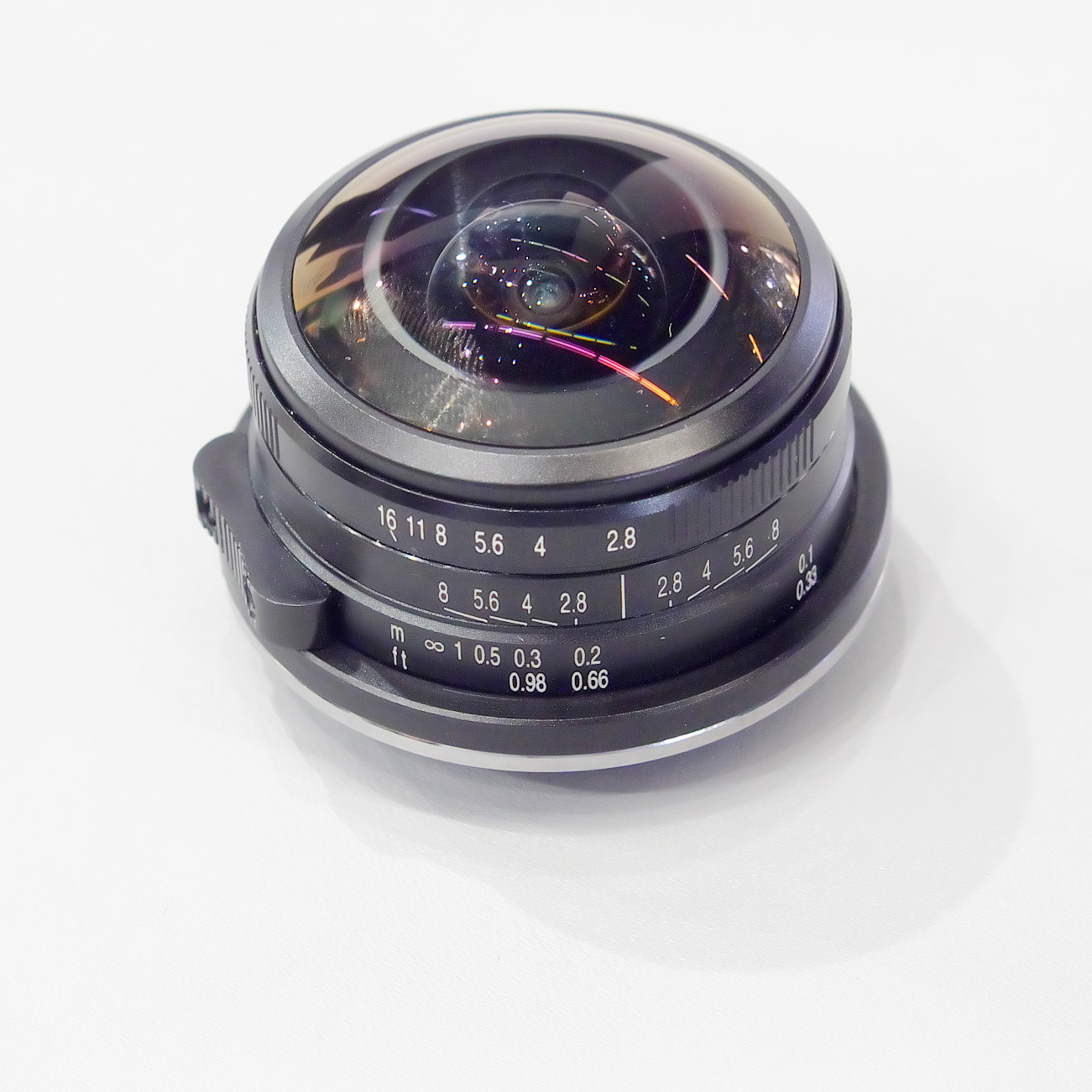
The Venus Optics Laowa 4 mm f/2.8 fisheye lens with an angle of view of 210°

Manual focus fisheye lenses for Micro Four Thirds
| Brand | Product Name | Focal length | 35mm equiv. | Max. Aperture | Circ. / FF (FoV) | Dims. (Φ×L) | Weight | Constr. | Min. focus (mag.) | Remarks |
|---|---|---|---|---|---|---|---|---|---|---|
| Entaniya | Fisheye HAL 250 MFT 2.3 | 2.3mm | 4.6mm | f/2.8 | C (250°) | ? | 1,600 g (56 oz) | 18e/12g | ? | Image circle 9 mm (dia.) |
| Entaniya | Fisheye HAL 250 MFT 3.0 | 3.0mm | 6mm | f/2.8 | C (250°) | ? | 1,600 g (56 oz) | 18e/12g | ? | Image circle 11.9 mm (dia.) |
| Meike | MK-3.5mm f/2.8 Fisheye | 3.5mm | 7mm | f/2.8 | C (220°) | 60 mm × 48 mm (2.4 in × 1.9 in) | 190 g (6.7 oz) | 10e/7g | 0.095 m (3.7 in) | |
| Entaniya | Fisheye HAL 250 MFT 3.6 | 3.6mm | 7.2mm | f/2.8 | FF (250°) | ? | 1,600 g (56 oz) | 18e/12g | ? | Image circle 14.25 mm (dia.) |
| Entaniya | Fisheye HAL 200 MFT 3.6 | 3.6mm | 7.2mm | f/4.0 | C (200°) | ? | 860 g (30 oz) | 17e/11g | ? | Image circle 12 mm (dia.) |
| Venus Optics | Laowa 4 mm f/2,8 | 4mm | 8mm | f/2.8 | C (210°) | 45.2 mm × 25.5 mm (1.78 in × 1.00 in) | 135 g (4.8 oz) | 7e/6g | 0.08 m (3.1 in) (0.11×) | |
| 7artisans | 7artisans fisheye | 4mm | 8mm | f/2.8 | C (225°) | ? | 201 g (7.1 oz) | 10e/8g | 0.15 m (5.9 in) | |
| Entaniya | Fisheye HAL 200 MFT 4.2 | 4.2mm | 8.4mm | f/4.0 | C (200°) | ? | 860 g (30 oz) | 17e/11g | ? | Image circle 13.8 mm (dia.) |
| Entaniya | Fisheye HAL 250 MFT 4.3 | 4.3mm | 8.6mm | f/2.8 | FF (250°) | ? | 1,600 g (56 oz) | 18e/12g | ? | Image circle 17 mm (dia.) |
| Entaniya | Fisheye HAL 200 MFT 5.0 | 5.0mm | 10.0mm | f/4.0 | FF (200°) | ? | 860 g (30 oz) | 17e/11g | ? | Image circle 16.6 mm (dia.) |
| Lensbaby | Lensbaby 5.8mm f/3.5 Circular Fisheye | 5.8mm | 11.6mm | f/3.5 | C (185°) | 70 mm × 70 mm (2.75 in × 2.75 in) | 330 g (11.6 oz) | 8e/5g | 0.0064 m (1/4 in) | 185° Field of view |
| Entaniya | Fisheye HAL 200 MFT 6.0 | 6.0mm | 12.0mm | f/4.0 | FF (200°) | ? | 860 g (30 oz) | 17e/11g | ? | Image circle 19.9 mm (dia.) |
| Meike | MK-6.5mm f/2.0 Fisheye | 6.5mm | 13mm | f/2.0 | C (190°) | 61 mm × 51.5 mm (2.40 in × 2.03 in) | 300 g (11 oz) | 6e/5g | 0.19 m (7.5 in) | Slightly cropped from circle |
| 7artisans | 7artisans 7.5mm f/2.8 Fisheye MFT | 7.5mm | 15mm | f/2.8 | FF (180°) | ? | ? | 11e/10g | ? | |
| Meike | MK-7.5mm f/2.8 Fisheye | 7.5mm | 15mm | f/2.8 | FF (146°) | ? | 260 g (9.2 oz) | 11e/9g | 0.15 m (5.9 in) | |
| Samyang | Samyang 7.5mm f/3.5 UMC Fish-eye MFT | 7.5mm | 15mm | f/3.5 | FF (180°) | 60.0 mm × 48.3 mm (2.36 in × 1.90 in) | 190 g (6.7 oz) | 9e/7g | 0.09 m (3.5 in) | Also sold under Walimex, Bower, and Rokinon brand names Cine version available. |
| TTArtisan | TTArtisan 7.5mm f/2 Fisheye MFT | 7.5mm | 15mm | f/2 | FF (180°) | ? | 343 g (12.1 oz) | 11e/8g | 0.125 m (4.9 in) | |
| Meike | MK-8mm f/3.5 Fisheye | 8mm | 16mm | f/3.5 | FF (200°) | 77 mm × 84 mm (3.0 in × 3.3 in) | 540 g (19 oz) | 11e/8g | 0.10 m (3.9 in) | 200° Field of view |
| Peleng | Peleng 8mm f/3.5 Fisheye | 8mm | 16mm | f/3.5 | FF (180°) | 73 mm × 65.5 mm (2.87 in × 2.58 in) | 400 g (14 oz) | 11e/7g | 0.22 m (8.7 in) | Adapted from native mount (M42) |
| Samyang | Rokinon 8mm f/3.5 UMC Fisheye CS II | 8mm | 16mm | f/3.5 | FF (139.3°) | 77.8 mm × 99.9 mm (3.06 in × 3.93 in) | 440 g (16 oz) | 10e/7g | 0.3 m (12 in) | Cine version available. |
| Olympus | Olympus 9mm f/8 Fisheye Body Cap | 9mm | 18mm | f/8.0 | FF (180°) | 56 mm × 12.8 mm (2.20 in × 0.50 in) | 30 g (1.1 oz) | 5e/4g | 0.20 m (7.9 in) (0.046×) | Fixed aperture, manual focus |
| Samyang? | Rokinon 9mm f/8.0 RMC | 9mm | 18mm | f/8.0 | FF (168°) | 65 mm × 57 mm (2.6 in × 2.2 in) | 270 g (9.6 oz) | 4e/4g | 0.30 m (12 in) | |
| Samyang | Samyang 12mm f/2.8 ED AS NCS FISH-EYE | 12mm | 24mm | f/2.8 | FF (97.3°) | 77.3 mm × 97.5 mm (3.04 in × 3.84 in) | 520 g (18 oz) | 12e/8g | 0.2 m (7.9 in) | Cine version available. |

== Specialty lenses ==
Special purpose lenses for Micro Four Thirds
| Brand | Product Name | Focal length | 35mm equiv. | Max. Aperture | Filter (mm) | Dims. (Φ×L) | Weight | Constr. | Min. focus (mag.) | Remarks |
|---|---|---|---|---|---|---|---|---|---|---|
| Wanderlust | Wanderlust Pinwide | 11mm | 22mm | f/96 | —N/a | ? | ? | 0e/0g | ∞ (fixed) | Pinhole lens |
| SLR Magic | SLR Magic Toy Pinhole MFT | 12mm | 24mm | f/128 | 52 | 57 mm × 4.5 mm (2.24 in × 0.18 in) | 20 g (0.71 oz) | 1e/1g | ∞ (fixed) | Pinhole lens with glass cover |
| Panasonic | Panasonic Lumix G 12.5mm 3D lens | 12.5mm | 25mm | f/12 | —N/a | 57 mm × 20.5 mm (2.24 in × 0.81 in) | 45 g (1.6 oz) | 4e/3g (×2) | 0.6 m (24 in) (0.02×) | 3D (stereo) imaging |
| Lensbaby | Lensbaby Sol 22 | 22mm | 44mm | f/3.5 | 46 | ? | ? | 3e/2g | 0.0889 m (3.50 in) | |
| Samyang | Samyang Tilt/Shift Lens 24mm F3.5 ED AS UMC | 24mm | 48mm | f/3.5 | 82 | 86 mm × 134 mm (3.4 in × 5.3 in) | 730 g (26 oz) | 16e/11g | 0.2 m (7.9 in) | Perspective control using Scheimpflug principle |
| Lensbaby | Lensbaby Trio 28 | 28mm | 56mm | f/3.5 | 46 | ? | ? | 3e/3g (Sweet); 4e/3g (Twist); 3e/2g (Velvet) | 0.200 m (7.9 in) | |
| Yasuhara | Yasuhara Momo 100 | 43mm | 86mm | f/6.4 | 37 | 61 mm × 35 mm (2.4 in × 1.4 in) | 126 g (4.4 oz) | 2e/2g | 0.30 m (12 in) | Soft focus |
| ARAX | ARAX 2/50mm Tilt & Shift | 50mm | 100mm | f/2.0 | 46 | ? | 270 g (9.5 oz) | 6e/?g | 0.35 m (14 in) | |
| Lensbaby | Lensbaby Spark 2.0 | 50mm | 100mm | f/2.5 | 46 | 63.5 mm × 50.8 mm (2.50 in × 2.00 in) | 180 g (6.5 oz) | 2e/1g | 0.38 m (15 in) | Accepts Optic Swap lenses |
| SLR Magic | SLR Magic 12-36x50 ED Spotting Scope | 420–1260mm | 840–2520mm | f/12 | 62 | ?×265 mm (10.4 in) | 800 g (28 oz) | ? | 4.6 m (180 in) | |

=== 3D lenses ===
- Panasonic Lumix G 12.5mm 3D lens f/12 (35mm EFL and aperture = 65mmf/24) when using 16:9 format on Panasonic Lumix DMC-GH2. This lens is only compatible with newer Panasonic bodies and the Olympus OMD E-M5. Not compatible with Panasonic Lumix DMC G-1, GF-1 and GH-1. Not compatible with any Olympus PEN digital cameras.

=== Digiscoping lenses ===
- SLR Magic 12-36x50 ED spotting scope for micro four thirds f/8-25 (announced September 2011)(35mm EFL and aperture = 840–2520 mm f/16-50)

=== Pinhole ===
- SLR Magic x Toy Lens Pinhole f/128 'lens' cap (announced March 2012)(35mm EFL and aperture = 12mm f/256)
- Wanderlust Pinwide f/96–f/128 'lens' cap

=== Special effects ===
- Lensbaby Trio 28mm f/3.5. 3-in-1 effects.
- Lensbaby Sol 22mm f/3.5. Creates a spot of focus effect surrounded by smooth bokeh.
- Lensbaby Spark 2.0 50mm f/2.5. Squeeze and tilt it to focus.
- ARAX/Photex MC 50mm f/2 Tilt-Shift.
- Samyang 24mm F3.5 ED AS UMC Tilt-Shift.

| Brand | Form | Class | 2008 | 2009 | 2010 | 2011 | | | 2012 | 2013 | 2014 | 2015 | 2016 | 2017 | 2018 | 2019 | 2020 | 2021 | 2022 | 2023 | 2024 | 2025 | 2026 |
| Olympus | SLR style OM-D | Professional | | | | | | | | | | | | | | | E-M1X ^{R} | | | | | | |
| Olympus | SLR style OM-D | High-end | | | | | | | | | E-M1 | | | E-M1 II ^{R} | | | E-M1 III ^{R} | | | | | | |
| Olympus | SLR style OM-D | Advanced | | | | | | | E-M5 | | | E-M5 II ^{R} | | | | | E-M5 III ^{R} | | | | | | |
| Olympus | SLR style OM-D | Mid-range | | | | | | | | | E-M10 | | E-M10 II | | E-M10 III | | | E-M10 IV | | | | | |
| Olympus | Rangefinder style PEN | Mid-range | | E-P1 | E-P2 | | E-P3 | | | | E-P5 | | PEN-F ^{R} | | | | | | | | | | |
| Olympus | Rangefinder style PEN | Upper-entry | | | E-PL1 | E-PL2 | | E-PL3 | E-PL5 | | E-PL6 | E-PL7 | | E-PL8 | E-PL9 | | E-PL10 | | | | | | |
| Olympus | Rangefinder style PEN | Entry-level | | | | | E-PM1 | | E-PM2 | | | | | | | | | | | | | | |
| Olympus | remote | | | | | | | | | | | | | Air | | | | | | | | | |
| OM System | SLR style | Professional | | | | | | | | | | | | | | | | | OM-1 ^{R} | | OM-1 II ^{R} | | |
| OM System | SLR style | High-end | | | | | | | | | | | | | | | | | | | | OM-3 ^{R} | |
| OM System | SLR style | Advanced | | | | | | | | | | | | | | | | | | OM-5 ^{R} | | | OM-5 II ^{R} |
| OM System | PEN | Mid-range | | | | | | | | | | | | | | | | | E-P7 | | | | |
| Panasonic | SLR style | High-end Video | | | | | | | | | | | | | GH5S | | | | GH6 ^{R} | | | GH7 ^{R} | |
| Panasonic | SLR style | High-end Photo | | | | | | | | | | | | | G9 ^{R} | | | | | | G9 II ^{R} | | |
| Panasonic | SLR style | High-end | | GH1 | | GH2 | | | GH3 | | GH4 | | | | GH5 | | | | GH5II | | | | |
| Panasonic | SLR style | Mid-range | | G1 | G2 | | G3 | | G5 | | G6 | | G7 | G80/G85 | | | G90/G95 | | | | | | |
| Panasonic | SLR style | Entry-level | | | G10 | | | | | | | | | | | | | G100 | | | G100D | | |
| Panasonic | Rangefinder style | Advanced | | | | | | | GX1 | | GX7 | | GX8 | | GX9 | | | | | | | | |
| Panasonic | Rangefinder style | Mid-range | | | | | | | | | GM1 | GM5 | GX80/GX85 | | | | | | | | | | |
| Panasonic | Rangefinder style | Entry-level | | | GF1 | GF2 | GF3 | | GF5 | | GF6 | GF7 | GF8 | GX800/GX850/GF9 | | GX880/GF10/GF90 | | | | | | | |
| Panasonic | Camcorder | Professional | | | | | | | AG-AF104 | | | | | | | | | | | | | | |
| Kodak | Rangefinder style | Entry-level | | | | | | | | | | S-1 | | | | | | | | | | | |
| DJI | Drone | . | | | | | | | | | | | | Zenmuse X5S | | | | | | | | | |
| DJI | Drone | . | | | | | | | | | | | | Zenmuse X5 | | | | | | | | | |
| YI | Rangefinder style | Entry-level | | | | | | | | | | | | M1 | | | | | | | | | |
| Yongnuo | Rangefinder style | Android camera | | | | | | | | | | | | | | | YN450M | | YN455 | | | | |
| Blackmagic Design | Rangefinder style | High-End Video | | | | | | | Cinema Camera | | | | | | | | | | | | | | |
| Blackmagic Design | Rangefinder style | High-End Video | | | | | | | | | Pocket Cinema Camera | | | | | Pocket Cinema Camera 4K | | | | | | | |
| Blackmagic Design | | High-End Video | | | | | | | | | | Micro Cinema Camera | | | | | | | | | Micro Studio Camera 4K G2 | | |
| Z CAM | Cinema | Advanced | | | | | | | | | | | E1 | | | E2 | | | | | | | |
| Z CAM | Cinema | Mid-Range | | | | | | | | | | | | | | | | E2-M4 | | | | | |
| Z CAM | Cinema | Entry-Level | | | | | | | | | | | | | | | E2C | | | | | | |
| JVC | Camcorder | Professional | | | | | | | | | | GY-LS300 | | | | | | | | | | | |
| SVS-Vistek | | Industrial | | | | | | | EVO Tracer | | | | | | | | | | | | | | |
