= Panasonic Lumix G X Vario PZ 45-175mm =

Lumix 45-175mm
- Maker: Panasonic

Technical data
- Focal length: 45-175mm
- Focal length (35mm equiv.): 90-350mm
- Aperture (max/min): f/4.0-5.6
- Close focus distance: 0.9 m (3 ft)
- Max. magnification: 0.40
- Diaphragm blades: 7, rounded
- Construction: 14 elements in 10 groups

Features
- Lens-based stabilization: Yes Yes
- Macro capable: No No
- Application: Tele zoom

Physical
- Max. length: 90 mm (3.5 in)
- Diameter: 62 mm (2.4 in)
- Weight: 210g (7.4 oz)
- Filter diameter: 46mm

Angle of view
- Diagonal: 7.1-27 deg.

History
- Introduction: Fall 2011

The Panasonic Lumix G X Vario PZ 45-175mm lens f/4.0-5.6 lens is a zoom lens for Micro Four Thirds system cameras. In the Micro Four Thirds format, it is moderately to long telephoto.

The lens has both manual and power zoom (via a rocker switch), useful for smooth zoom motion during videography. Focusing is quiet. The lens has Panasonic's "nano surface coating" for increased contrast and reduced flare. The front of the lens neither extends nor rotates, beneficial for polarized filters. The 46mm thread diameter allows sharing of filters with the Panasonic 14mm, 15mm, 20mm, 25mm, 45mm, Olympus M.Zuiko Digital ED 12mm f/2 and Olympus M.Zuiko Digital 25mm f/1.8 lenses.
