= Panasonic Leica DG 25mm lens =

DG Summilux 25mm
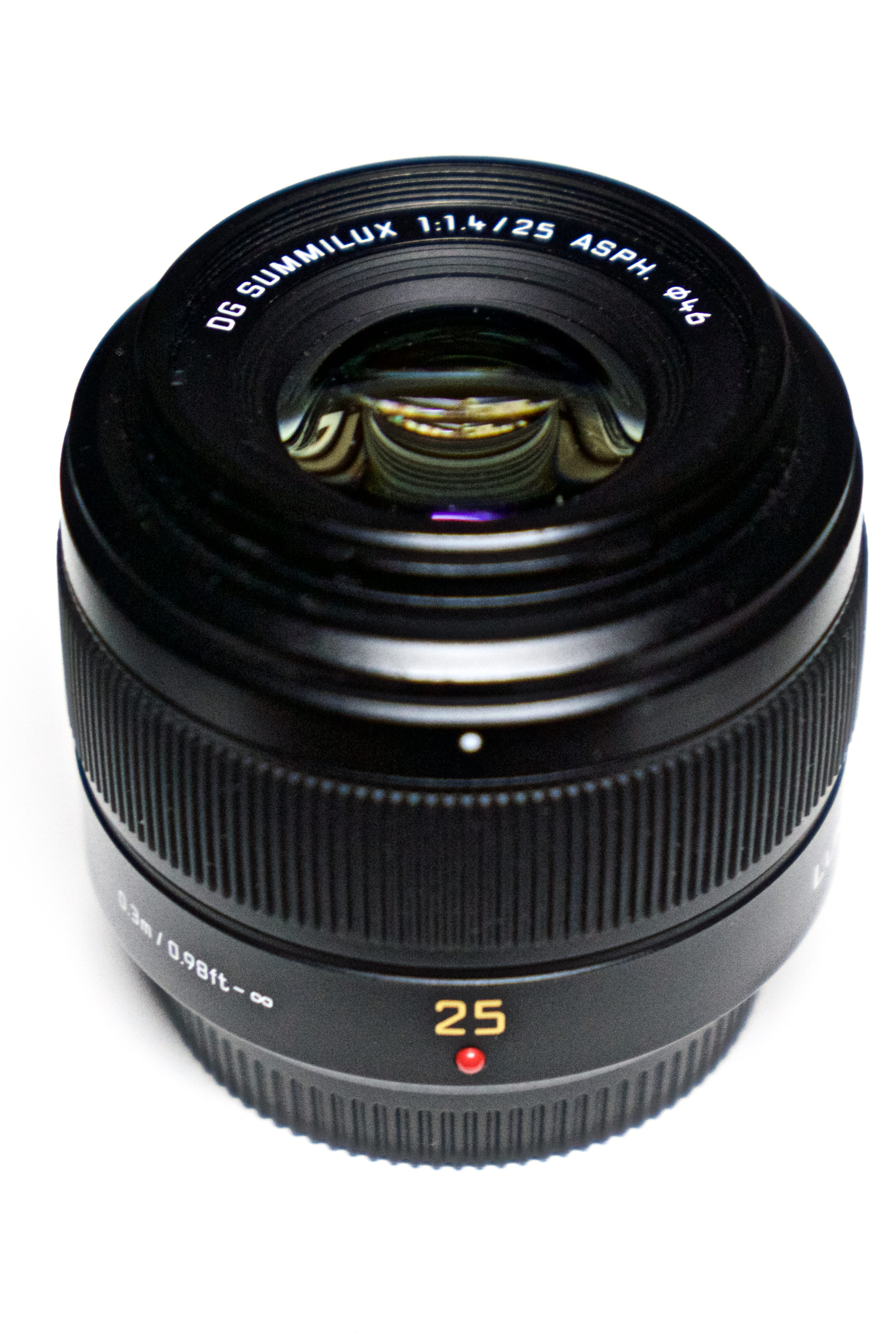
- Maker: Panasonic

Technical data
- Type: Normal
- Focal length: 25mm
- Focal length (35mm equiv.): 50mm
- Aperture (max/min): f/1.4 - f/16
- Close focus distance: 0.3 m (0.98 ft)
- Max. magnification: 1.1
- Diaphragm blades: 7 blades, round
- Construction: 7 elements in 9 groups

Features
- Lens-based stabilization: No No

Physical
- Max. length: 54.5 mm (2.1 in)
- Diameter: 63 mm (2.5 in)
- Weight: 200g (7.0 oz)
- Filter diameter: 46 mm

Angle of view
- Diagonal: 47 deg.

History
- Introduction: 2011

The Panasonic Leica DG Summilux 25mm f/1.4 lens is a normal lens for Micro Four Thirds system cameras. It is co-branded between Leica and Panasonic, built in Japan under Leica management.

Focusing is internal, so polarizing filters can be used consistently. The 46mm thread lets a Micro Four Thirds user share filters between it, the Panasonic 14mm, Panasonic Lumix 20mm, Panasonic Lumix 45mm, Panasonic 45-175mm, Olympus M.Zuiko Digital ED 12mm f/2 and Olympus M.Zuiko Digital ED 60mm f/2.8 Macro lenses.

Reviews are positive, ranging from "very sharp" to "sensational".
