= Sony E 20mm F2.8 =

- Maker: Sony
- Lens mount(s): Sony E-mount

Technical data
- Type: Prime
- Focus drive: Stepper motor
- Focal length: 20mm
- Focal length (35mm equiv.): 30mm
- Image format: APS-C
- Aperture (max/min): f/2.8 - 22.0
- Close focus distance: 0.20 metres (0.66 ft)
- Max. magnification: 1:8 (0.12x)
- Diaphragm blades: 7
- Construction: 6 elements in 6 groups

Features
- Manual focus override: Yes Yes
- Weather-sealing: No No
- Lens-based stabilization: No No
- Aperture ring: No No
- Unique features: Pancake lens
- Application: Landscape, Street

Physical
- Max. length: 20.4 millimetres (0.80 in)
- Diameter: 62.6 millimetres (2.46 in)
- Weight: 69 grams (0.152 lb)
- Filter diameter: 49mm

Accessories
- Lens hood: None

History
- Introduction: 2013

Retail info
- MSRP: $324 USD

The Sony E 20mm F2.8 is a wide-angle prime lens for the Sony E-mount, announced by Sony in April 2013.

== Build quality ==
The lens itself is made of a glossy black plastic shell over plastic internals and includes a detachable pancake-style lens hood. The lens itself is colloquially referred to as a pancake lens as it is currently the thinnest lens offered for Sony E-mount.

The lens can also be adapted with a 16mm ultra-wide angle or a 12mm fisheye converter, which are both sold separately from the lens itself. Neither allow for corrected Exif data to be recorded to the camera while the converter is attached.

== Image quality ==
The image quality of the lens is significantly better than that of the 16mm pancake lens, suffering mild barrel distortion and moderate vignetting. Due to compromises made to keep its physical size to a minimum, the lens is one of Sony's softer lenses

== See also ==
- List of Sony E-mount lenses
- Sony E 16mm F2.8
- Pancake lens
