= Pancake lens =

Term for a thin, flat camera lens

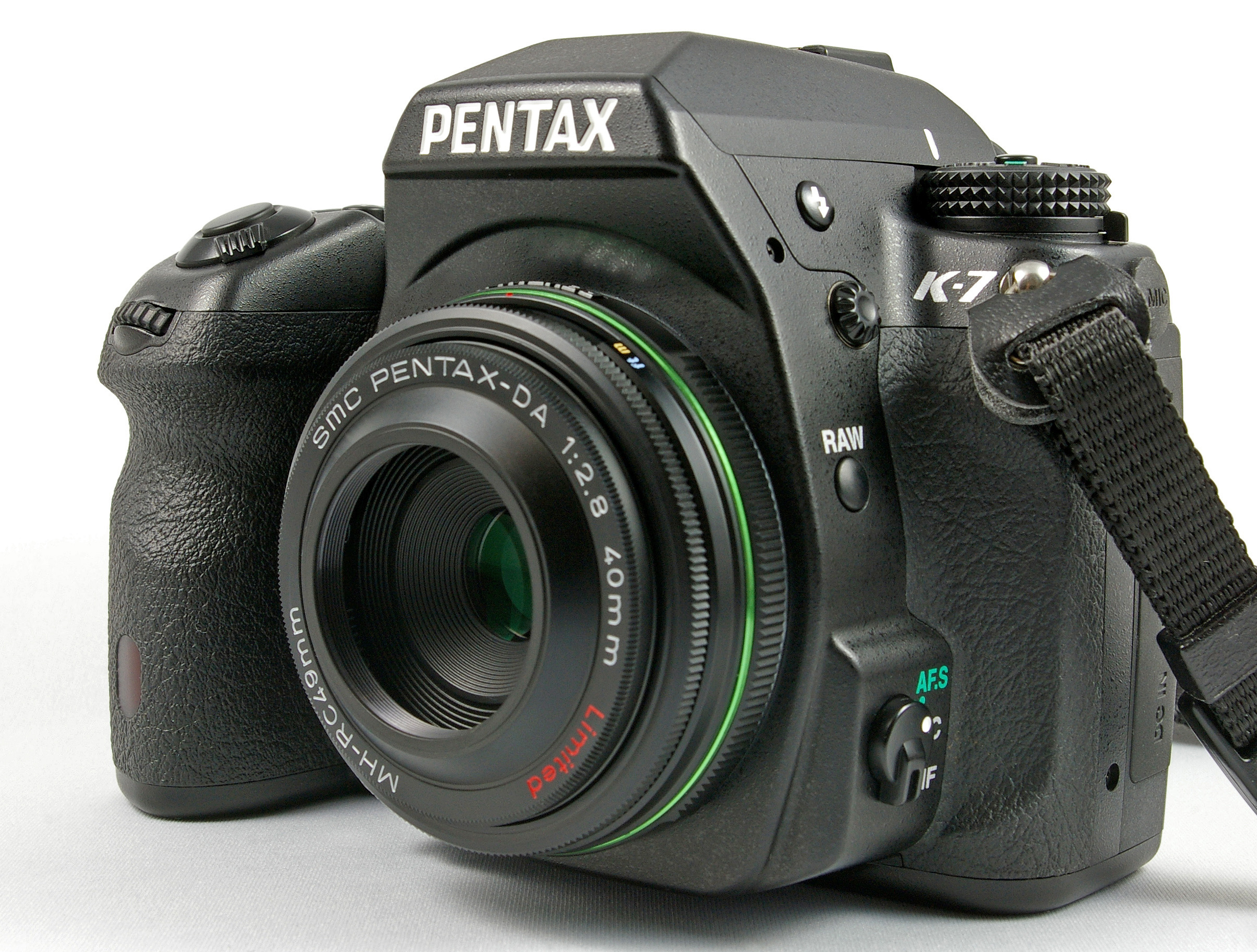
A DSLR camera with pancake lens

A pancake lens is a colloquial term for a flat, thin camera lens assembly (short barrel). The majority are prime lenses of a normal or slightly wider angle of view, but some are zoom lenses.

== Motivation ==
Pancake lenses are primarily valued for providing quality optics in a compact package. The resulting camera and lens assembly may even be small enough to be pocketable, a design feature which is usually impractical with conventional SLR bodies and lens assemblies. Pancake lenses can be very short and flat because they do not need large amounts of optical correction, i.e. extra lens elements.

The problem arises when such lenses have too short a focal length to fit in front of the retractable mirrors used in reflex cameras. In such a situation, a pancake lens focuses in front of, rather than on, the focal plane (film or light sensor) of the camera. This has necessitated the design of retrofocus lenses that refocus the image further back, which is why such lenses are longer and bulkier than their "pancake" equivalents.

Pancake-style prime lenses are typically simpler to manufacture than pancake zoom lenses like Sony E PZ 16-50mm F3.5-5.6 due to the lack of an internal micromotor and fewer image correcting elements, allowing for a thinner profile. Due to this limitation, pancake zoom lenses are less common.

While there is no specific size and weight in defining a pancake lens, most are light-weight and no more than a few centimeters in length. This varies greatly depending upon the lens' build quality, focal length, and maximum aperture.

== History ==
In the 1960s and 1970s, the Nikon GN lens was a notable example, while in the 1970s and 1980s, pancake lenses were used in compact single lens reflex (SLR) cameras.

Throughout the 2010s, the design has seen a resurgence due to the growth of the mirrorless interchangeable-lens digital camera market. Pancake lenses have increasingly become lighter and feature thinner profiles than years past. An extreme example of this trend would be the Pentax DA 40mm F2.8 XS, released in 2012 and measuring only 9.14 millimetres (0.360 in) long.

== Body-cap lenses ==
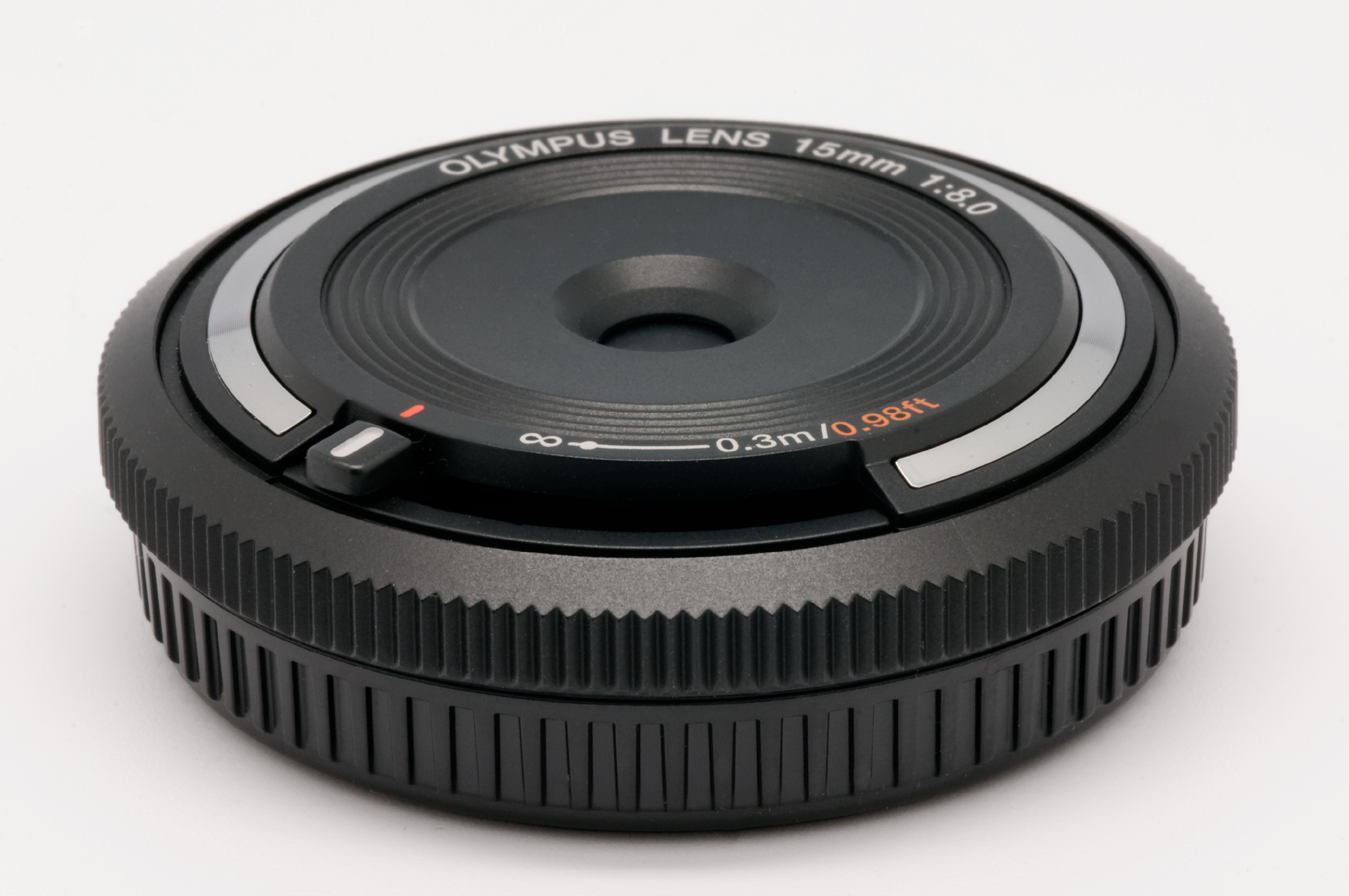
Olympus 15mm F8 body cap lens

A body-cap lens is an extreme type of pancake lens that is designed to both protect the camera internals as a body cap normally would, yet still allow the user to take photos. These lenses are manual focus only and generally have no more than a couple of optical lens elements, no image correcting elements, a very slow fixed aperture, an extremely thin focusing ring (if any), and a retractable lens element cover. Due to this compromise in design, body-cap lenses frequently suffer from numerous image quality issues such as heavy vignetting and poor image sharpness.

Examples of body-cap lenses include the Olympus 9mm F8 Fisheye and Olympus 15mm F8 for Micro Four Thirds and the Fujifilm XM-FL 24mm F8 for Fujifilm X-mount.

Panasonic released a manual-focus lens for the L-Mount that is nearly the size of a body cap, but it does not have a retractable lens cover: the Lumix S 26mm F8.

== List of pancake lenses ==
This is a list of autofocus prime lenses designed for mirrorless cameras that measure less than 30 millimeters in length — limit one per brand and focal length combination.

In 2024, Viltrox released the thinnest autofocus pancake lens ever produced for full-frame sensors: a 28mm F4.5 lens that is only 15mm thick. It is closer in size to a body-cap lens than to other pancake lenses.

Model	Lens mounts	Focal length (Note: 35mm equivalent.)	Aperture	Aperture ring	OIS	Weight	Length	Release year	Availability
1.0-type ("1-inch")
Samsung 9mm F3.5	NX-M	24mm	f/3.5	No	No	31g	13mm	2014	Discontinued
Nikon 10mm F2.8	1	27mm	f/2.8	No	No	77g	22mm	2011	Discontinued
Samsung 17mm F1.8	NX-M	46mm	f/1.8	No	Yes	55g	28mm	2014	Discontinued
Micro Four Thirds
Panasonic 14mm F2.5 II	MFT	28mm	f/2.5	No	No	55g	21mm	2014	Current
Olympus 17mm F2.8	MFT	34mm	f/2.8	No	No	71g	22mm	2009	Discontinued
Panasonic 20mm F1.7 II	MFT	40mm	f/1.7	No	No	87g	26mm	2013	Current
APS-C
Samsung 10mm F3.5 Fisheye	NX	15mm	f/3.5	iFn	No	72g	26mm	2013	Discontinued
Sony 16mm F2.8	E	24mm	f/2.8	No	No	67g	23mm	2010	Current
Samsung 16mm F2.4	NX	24mm	f/2.4	iFn	No	90g	24mm	2011	Discontinued
Leica 18mm F2.8	L	27mm	f/2.8	No	No	80g	21mm	2017	Discontinued
Sony 20mm F2.8	E	30mm	f/2.8	No	No	69g	20mm	2013	Current
Samsung 20mm F2.8	NX	30mm	f/2.8	iFn	No	89g	25mm	2010	Discontinued
Canon 22mm F2	EF-M	35mm	f/2.0	No	No	105g	24mm	2012	Current
Fujifilm 23mm F2.8 WR	X	35mm	f/2.8	Yes	No	90g	23mm	2025	Current
Nikon 26mm F2.8 (Note: Actually a full-frame lens.)	Z	39mm	f/2.8	No	No	125g	24mm	2023	Current
Fujifilm 27mm F2.8 WR	X	41mm	f/2.8	Yes	No	84g	23mm	2021	Current
TTArtisan 27mm F2.8	E, X, Z	41mm	f/2.8	Yes	No	88g	29mm	2022	Current
Viltrox 28mm F4.5	E, X	42mm	f/4.5	No	No	60g	15mm	2024	Current
Canon 28mm F2.8	RF	42mm	f/2.8	No	No	120g	25mm	2023	Current
Samsung 30mm F2	NX	45mm	f/2.0	No	No	85g	22mm	2010	Discontinued
Full frame
Nikon 26mm F2.8	Z	26mm	f/2.8	No	No	125g	24mm	2023	Current
Viltrox 28mm F4.5	E	28mm	f/4.5	No	No	60g	15mm	2024	Current
Canon 28mm F2.8	RF	28mm	f/2.8	No	No	120g	25mm	2023	Current

== List of pancake zoom lenses ==
This is a list of autofocus zoom lenses designed for mirrorless cameras that measure less than 33 millimeters in length.

Model	Lens mounts	Focal length		Aperture		OIS	PZ (Note: Power zoom.)	Weight	Length	Release year	Availability
Model	Lens mounts	Wide	Tele	Wide	Tele	OIS	PZ	Weight	Length	Release year	Availability
1.0-type ("1-inch")
Samsung 9-27mm F3.5-5.6	NX-M	24mm	73mm	f/3.5	f/5.6	Yes	No	73g	30mm	2014	Discontinued
Nikon 10-30mm F3.5-5.6 PD	1	27mm	81mm	f/3.5	f/5.6	Yes	Yes	85g	28mm	2014	Discontinued
Nikon 11-27.5mm F3.5-5.6	1	30mm	74mm	f/3.5	f/5.6	No	No	80g	31mm	2012	Discontinued
Micro Four Thirds
Panasonic 12-32mm F3.5-5.6	MFT	24mm	64mm	f/3.5	f/5.6	Yes	No	70g	24mm	2013	Current
Olympus 14-42mm F3.5-5.6 EZ	MFT	28mm	84mm	f/3.5	f/5.6	No	Yes	93g	23mm	2014	Current
Panasonic PZ 14-42mm F3.5-5.6	MFT	28mm	84mm	f/3.5	f/5.6	Yes	Yes	95g	27mm	2011	Current
APS-C
Sony 16-50mm F3.5-5.6	E	24mm	75mm	f/3.5	f/5.6	Yes	Yes	116g	30mm	2012	Current
Sony 16-50mm F3.5-5.6 II	E	24mm	75mm	f/3.5	f/5.6	Yes	Yes	107g	31mm	2024	Current
Samsung 16-50mm F3.5-5.6	NX	24mm	75mm	f/3.5	f/5.6	Yes	Yes	111g	31mm	2014	Discontinued
Nikon 16-50mm F3.5-6.3	Z	24mm	75mm	f/3.5	f/6.3	Yes	No	135g	32mm	2019	Current

== List of near-pancake lenses ==
This is a list of autofocus prime lenses designed for mirrorless cameras that measure between 30 and 38 millimeters in length.

Model	Lens mounts	Focal length	Aperture	Aperture ring	OIS	Weight	Length	Release year	Availability
1.0-type ("1-inch")
Nikon 18.5mm F1.8	1	50mm	f/1.8	No	No	70g	36mm	2012	Discontinued
Micro Four Thirds
Panasonic Leica 15mm F1.7	MFT	30mm	f/1.7	No	No	115g	36mm	2014	Current
DJI 15mm F1.7	MFT	30mm	f/1.7	No	No	115g	36mm	2015	Discontinued
Olympus 17mm F1.8	MFT	34mm	f/1.8	No	No	120g	36mm	2012	Current
APS-C
TTArtisan 14mm F3.5	E, X	21mm	f/3.5	Yes	No	98g	31mm	2025	Current
Fujifilm 18mm F2	X	27mm	f/2.0	Yes	No	116g	34mm	2012	Current
Full frame
Samyang 24mm F2.8 (Note: Also sold under the Rokinon brand.)	E	24mm	f/2.8	No	No	93g	37mm	2018	Current
Samyang 35mm F2.8	E	35mm	f/2.8	No	No	86g	33mm	2017	Current
Sony Zeiss 35mm F2.8	E	35mm	f/2.8	No	No	120g	37mm	2013	Current

The Canon RF 50mm F1.8 designed for full-frame sensors nearly qualifies at 40.5mm in length.

== List of older pancake lenses ==
Name	Type	Format	Length
Canon EF 40mm F2.8 STM	Prime	Full frame	22.8 millimetres (0.90 in)
Canon EF-S 24mm F2.8 STM	Prime	APS-C	22.9 millimetres (0.90 in)
Industar-22 51mm F3.5	Prime	Full frame	21.0 millimetres (0.83 in)
Industar-50 52mm F3.5	Prime	Full frame	20.0 millimetres (0.79 in)
Industar-69 28mm F2.8	Prime	Half frame	13.5 millimetres (0.53 in)
Konica Hexanon AR 40mm F1.8	Prime	Full frame	27.0 millimetres (1.06 in)
Neewer E 28mm F2.8	Prime	APS-C	29.0 millimetres (1.14 in)
Nikon 45mm F2.8 AI P	Prime	Full frame	17.0 millimetres (0.67 in)
Nikon 50mm F1.8 E AIS	Prime	Full frame	28.0 millimetres (1.10 in)
Nikon Auto GN Nikkor 45mm F2.8	Prime	Full frame	20.0 millimetres (0.79 in)
Olympus 25mm F2.8 ED	Prime	Four Thirds	23.5 millimetres (0.93 in)
Olympus E. Zuiko Auto-S 38mm F2.8	Prime	Half frame	14.0 millimetres (0.55 in)
Olympus Zuiko Auto-S 40mm F2	Prime	Full frame	25.0 millimetres (0.98 in)
Pentax DA 21mm F3.2	Prime	APS-C	25.0 millimetres (0.98 in)
Pentax DA 40mm F2.8	Prime	APS-C	15.0 millimetres (0.59 in)
Pentax DA 40mm F2.8 XS	Prime	APS-C	9.14 millimetres (0.360 in)
Pentax DA 70mm F2.4	Prime	APS-C	25.4 millimetres (1.00 in)
Pentax FA 43mm F1.9	Prime	Full frame	27.0 millimetres (1.06 in)
Voigtlander 20mm F3.5 Color Skopar SL II	Prime	Full frame	28.6 millimetres (1.13 in)
Voigtlander 40mm F2.0 Ultron SL II	Prime	Full frame	24.5 millimetres (0.96 in)

== Gallery ==
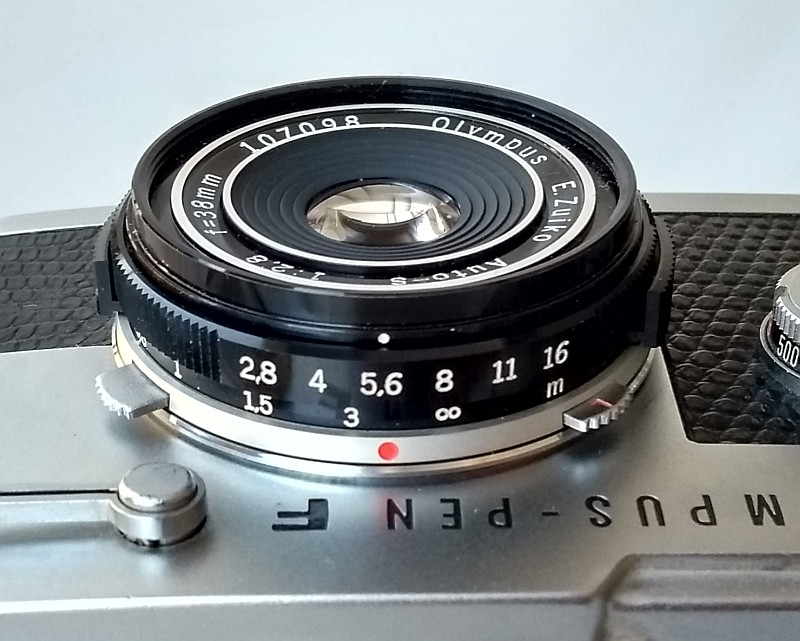
Olympus Pen F/FT (35mm analog film) lens E. Zuiko Auto-S 1:2.8 f=38mm 1966

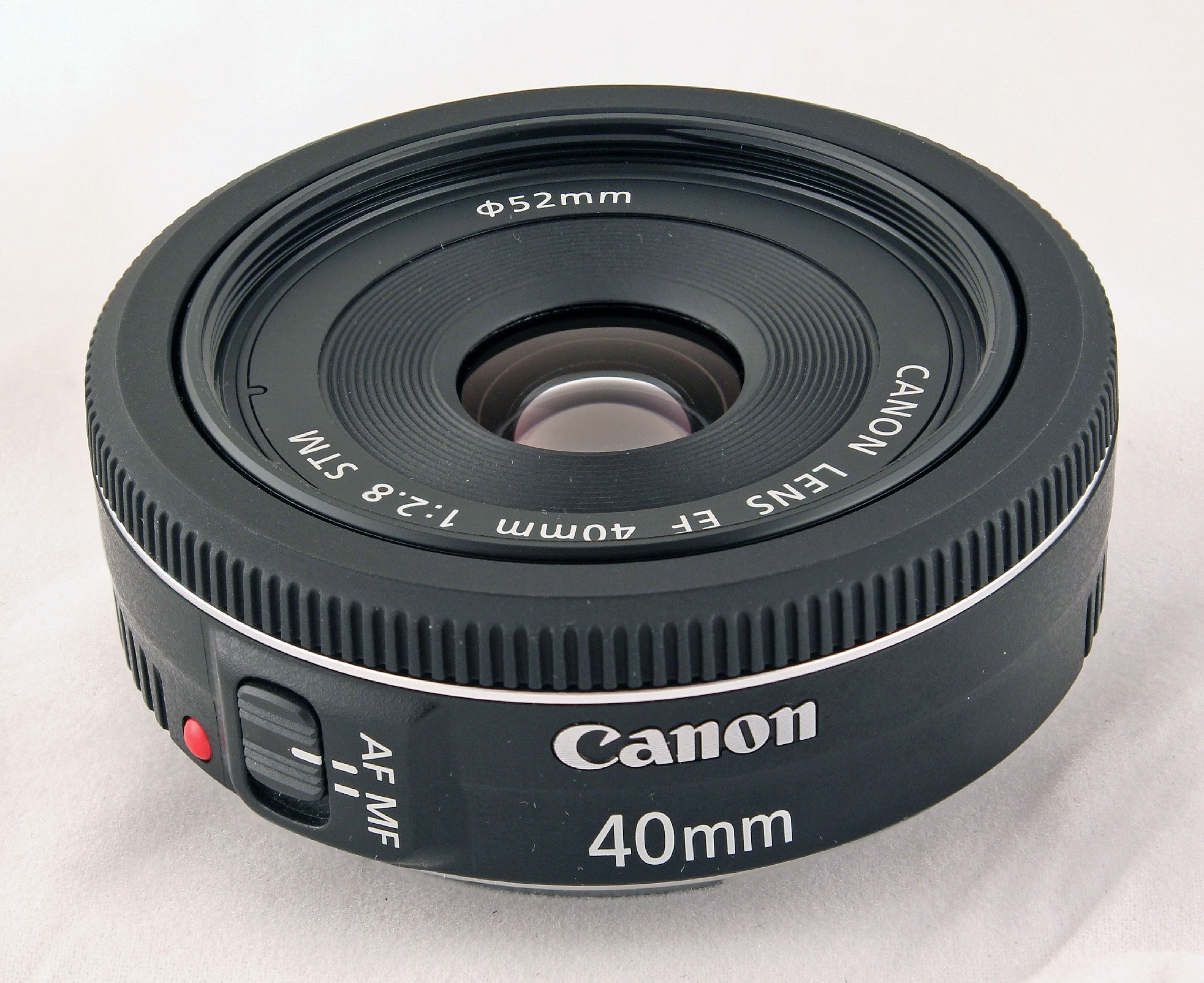
Canon EF 40mm F2.8 STM pancake lens

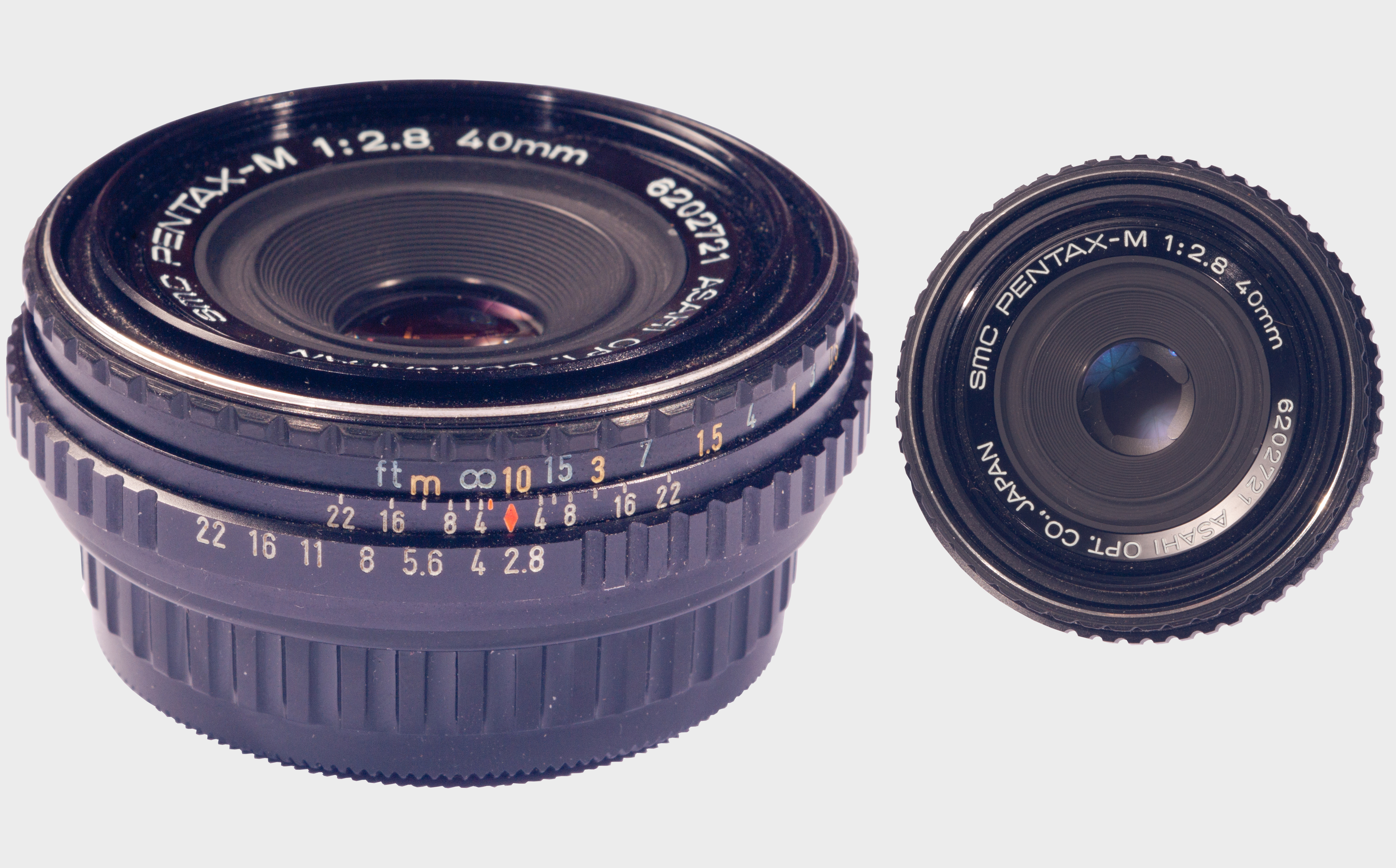
SMC Pentax-M 40mm

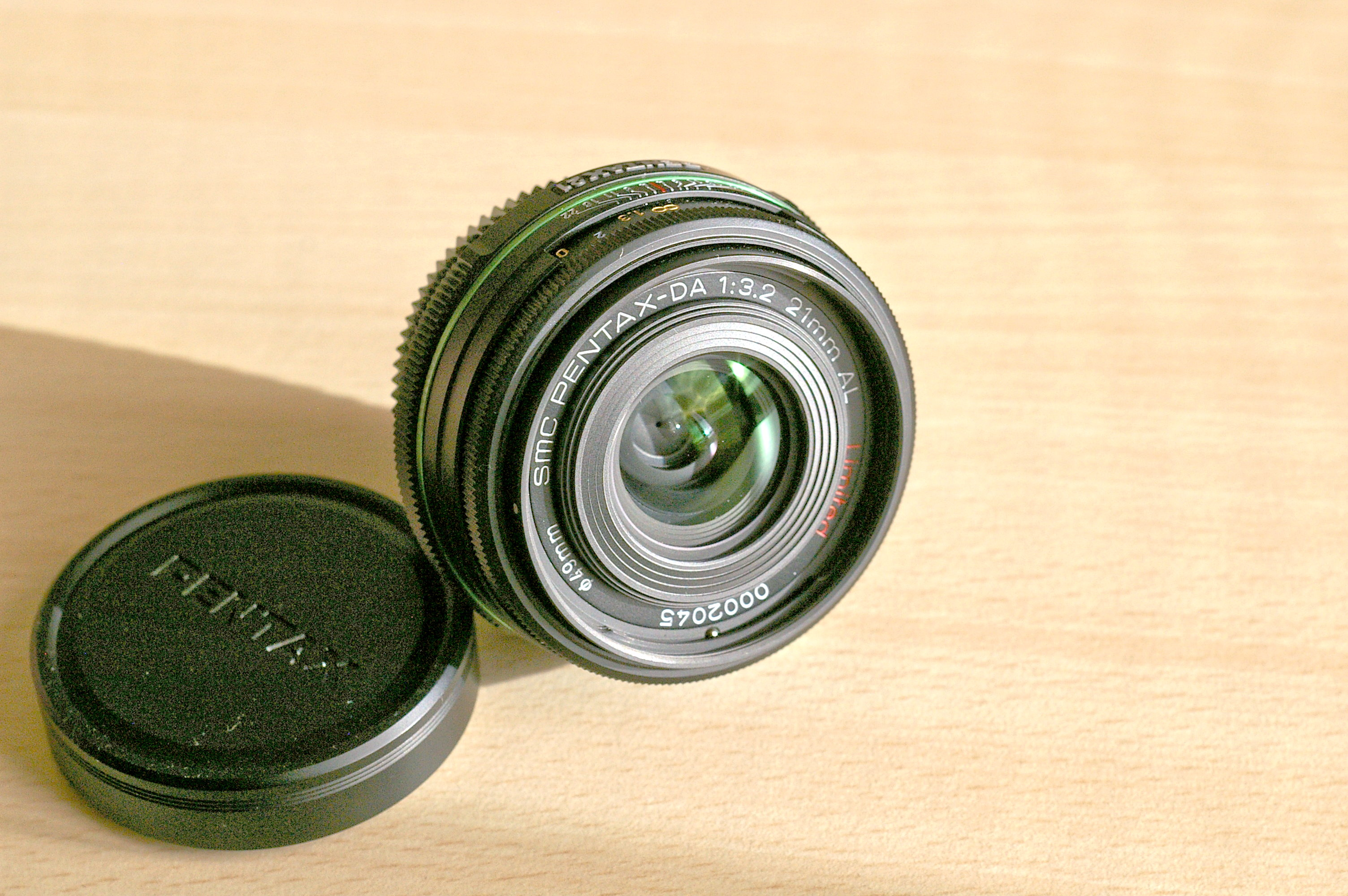
Pentax DA 1:3.2 21mm

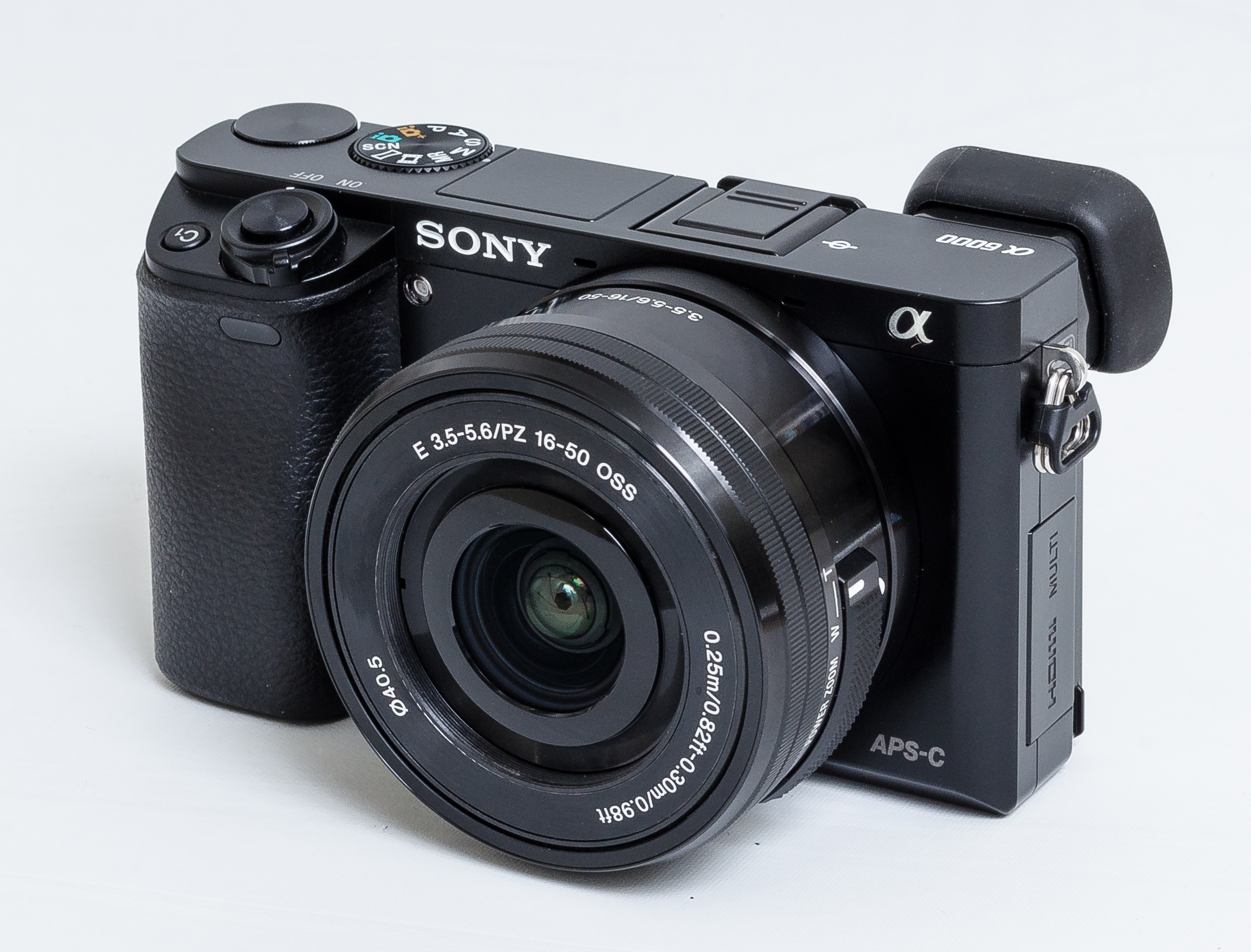
Sony E PZ 16-50mm F3.5-5.6 OSS pancake zoom lens

== Other uses ==
The term pancake lens also refers to a specific type of image forming lens used in virtual reality and mixed reality headsets. This type of lens uses the principle that circular polarization is flipped at reflections at optical boundaries to lengthen the light path across the lens. This enables shortening the distance between the eye and the screen, therefore making the goggles more compact.

== See also ==
- Immersive virtual reality
- Kit lens
- Standard zoom lens
