= Panasonic Lumix G 14mm lens =

Pancake-style camera lens

Lumix 14mm
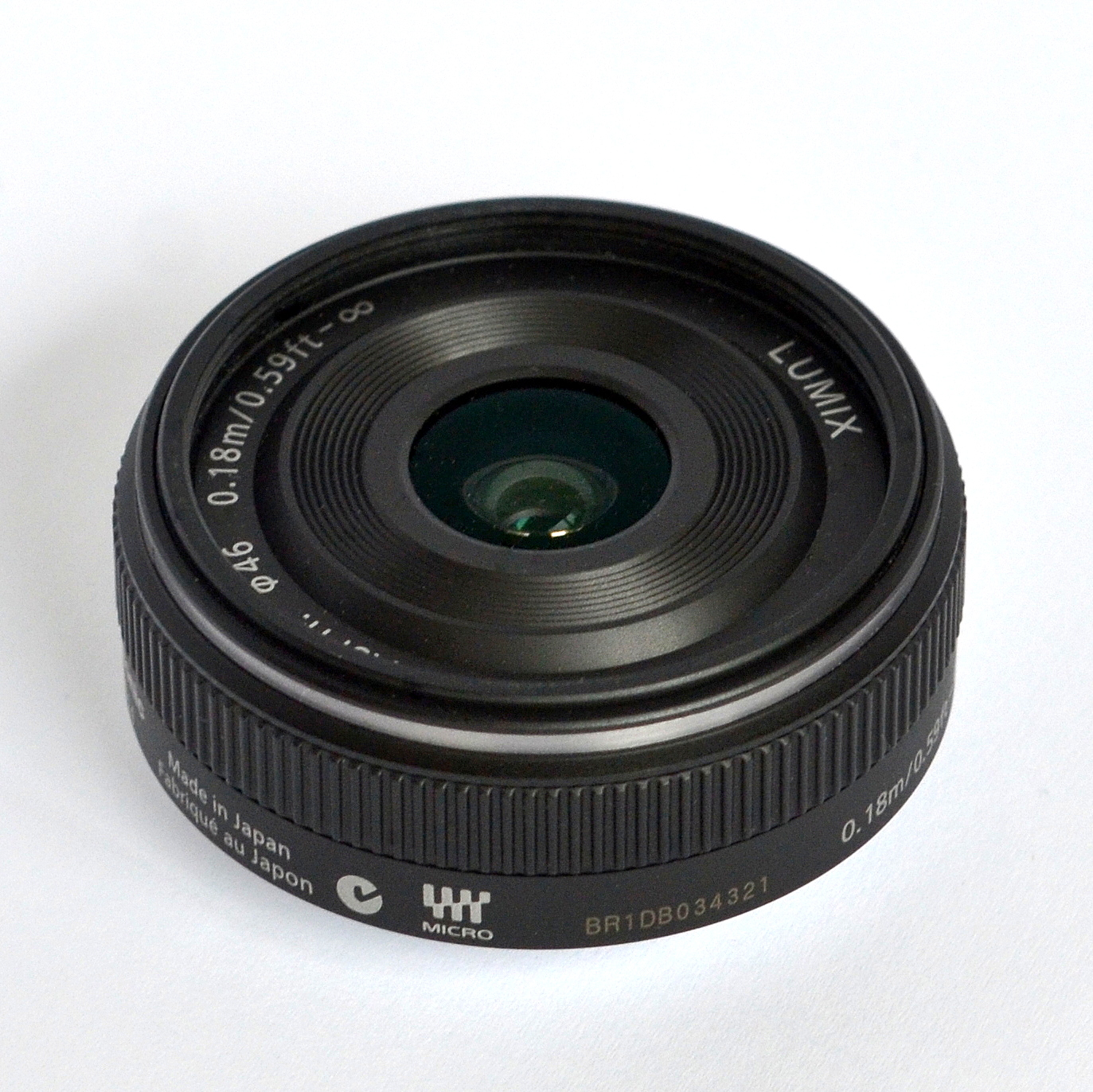
- Maker: Panasonic

Technical data
- Focal length: 14mm
- Focal length (35mm equiv.): 28mm
- Aperture (max/min): f/2.5
- Close focus distance: 0.18 m (7.1 in)
- Max. magnification: 0.10
- Construction: 6 elements in 5 groups

Features
- Lens-based stabilization: No No
- Macro capable: No No

Physical
- Max. length: 20.5 mm (.81 in)
- Diameter: 55 mm (2.19 in)
- Weight: 55g (1.9 oz)
- Filter diameter: 46mm

Angle of view
- Diagonal: 75 deg.

The Panasonic Lumix G 14mm F2.5 lens is a pancake-style prime lens for Micro Four Thirds system cameras. In the Micro Four Thirds format, it is moderately wide. As of its late-2010 release, it is claimed by Panasonic to be the lightest interchangeable digital-camera lens. It is the prime-lens option available with the Panasonic GF2 and GF3, and available separately.

Focusing is claimed to be suitable for video ("MSC"- movie and stills compatible), with a fast, quiet autofocus motor. The lens is "focus by wire"- the focusing ring sends commands, while the actual actuation is via a motor, even for manual focus. Focusing is internal- the front lens element does not rotate, allowing the consistent use of polarizing filters. The 46mm thread lets a Micro Four Thirds user share filters between it, the Panasonic 20mm, Panasonic Leica 25mm, Panasonic Leica 45mm lenses, and the Olympus M.Zuiko Digital ED 12mm f/2. The lens was sold with an optional detachable element, making the angle of view optically even wider, albeit at the cost of degraded resolution and heavy vignetting.

The lens has received good reviews. Reviewers liked the sharpness despite a very small size (perhaps even too small), and "silent, high speed" focusing. Criticism includes occasional vignetting, and some chromatic aberration. Some reviewers criticized software correction for distortion.

In 2014, an updated version of this lens called the Panasonic Lumix G 14mm F2.5 II was released. It has the same size, weight, and optical construction as the original.
