= Canon EOS 250D =

2019 APS-C digital single-lens reflex camera

Canon EOS 250D Canon EOS Rebel SL3 Canon EOS Kiss X10 EOS 200D Mark II
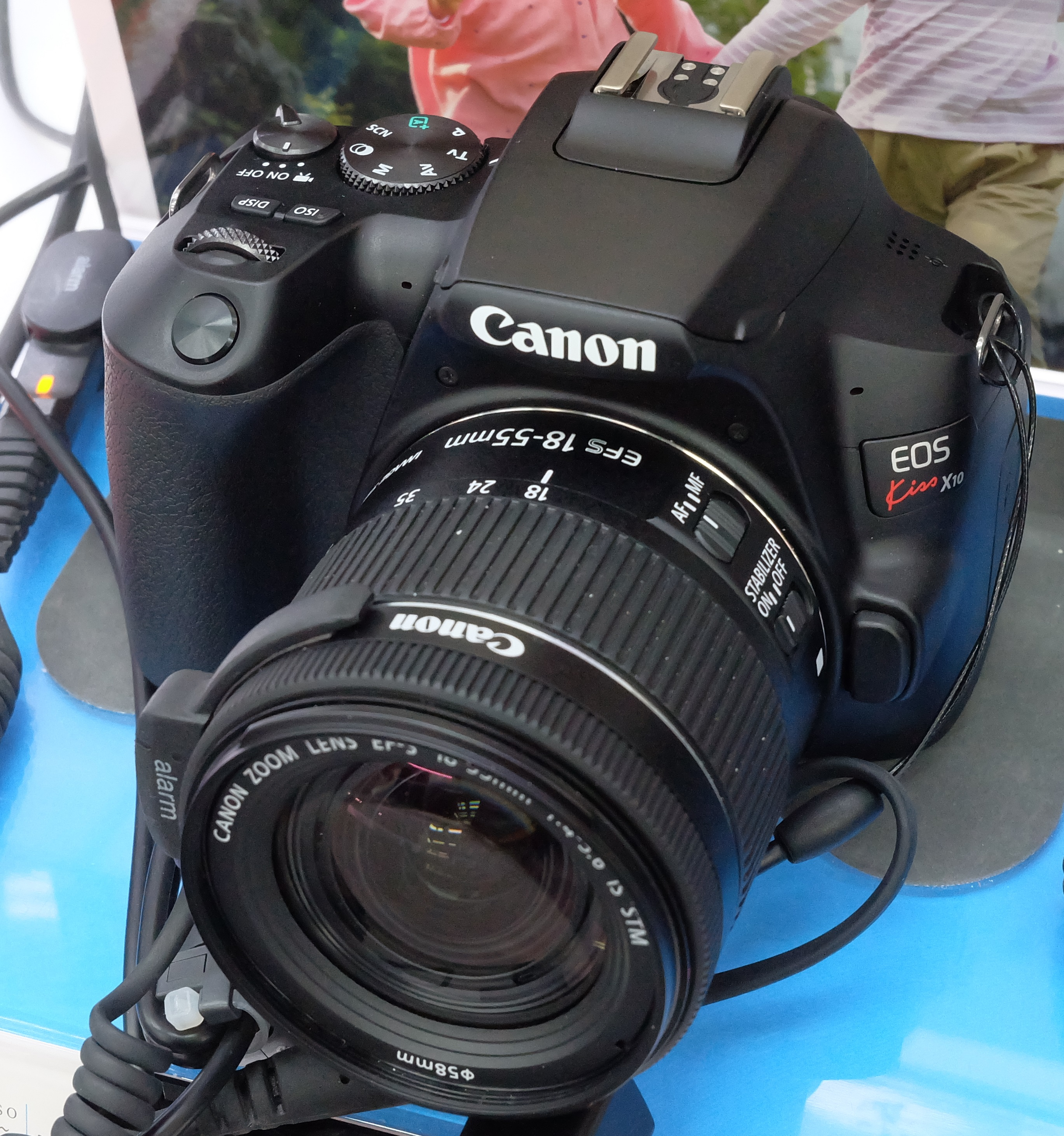
- EOS Kiss X10 + EF-S18-55mm F4-5.6 IS STM

Overview
- Maker: Canon Inc.
- Type: Digital single-lens reflex

Lens
- Lens mount: Canon EF-S
- Lens: Interchangeable

Sensor/medium
- Sensor type: CMOS
- Sensor size: 22.3 × 14.9 mm (APS-C format)
- Maximum resolution: 6000 × 4000 pixels (3.72 μm pixel size)
- Film speed: 100 – 25600 (expandable to H2: 51200)
- Storage media: SD/SDHC/SDXC card

Focusing
- Focus modes: One-Shot, AI Focus, AI Servo, Live View (FlexiZone - Single, Face detection, AF Quick)
- Focus areas: 9 AF points

Exposure/metering
- Exposure modes: Scene Intelligent Auto, Flash Off, Creative Auto, Portrait, Landscape, Close-up, Sports, Foods, Night Portrait, Program AE, Shutter priority AE, Aperture priority AE, Manual exposure, Movie
- Exposure metering: Full aperture TTL, 63 zones

Flash
- Flash: E-TTL II auto-pop-up built-in / External
- Flash bracketing: Yes

Shutter
- Shutter: Electronic focal-plane
- Shutter speed range: 1/4000 sec. – 30 sec. and Bulb; X-sync at 1/200 sec.
- Continuous shooting: 5.0 fps for unlimited JPEG and RAW frames

Viewfinder
- Viewfinder: Eye-level pentamirror with 95% coverage and 0.87× magnification / LCD (Live View)

Image processing
- Image processor: DIGIC 8
- White balance: Auto, Daylight, Shade, Cloudy, Tungsten, White Fluorescent, Flash, Custom
- WB bracketing: -/+ 5 stops in 1/2 or 1/3-stop increments

General
- LCD screen: 3" (7.62 cm) 3:2 aspect ratio color TFT vari-angle LCD touchscreen with 1,040,000 dots
- Battery: Li-Ion LP-E17 rechargeable
- Dimensions: 122.4×92.6×69.8 mm (4.82×3.65×2.75 in)
- Weight: 451 g (15.9 oz) CIPA
- Latest firmware: 1.0.3 / 21 May 2021; 4 years ago
- Made in: Taiwan

Chronology
- Predecessor: Canon EOS 200D
- Replaced by: Canon EOS R50 (mirrorless)

The Canon EOS 250D is a 24.1 megapixel entry-level digital single-lens reflex camera (DSLR) made by Canon. It was announced on 10 April 2019 with a suggested retail price of €549. It is also known as the EOS Kiss X10 in Japan, the EOS Rebel SL3 in North America, and the EOS 200D Mark II in Australia and Asia.

== Features ==
- 24.1 effective megapixel APS-C CMOS sensor
- EF / EFS Canon Mount
- ISO sensitivity 100–25600 (expandable to H2: 51200)
- 95% viewfinder frame coverage with 0.87× magnification
- Videos with 4K (cropped) resolution and 24 fps, 25 fps (NTSC / PAL), but no 30 fps mode.
- 1080p Full HD video recording up to 60 fps
- 720p HD video recording at up to 60 fps
- 5.0 frames per second continuous shooting
- Dual Pixel Focus with Face and Eye Detection
- Focus Peaking in MF
- Battery Life : 1070 shots (CIPA)

== Reception ==
Techradar labels the EOS 250D as an "entry-level all-rounder" and "one of the best entry-level DSLR cameras you can buy". Digital Camera World states that it's "the best for beginners" and describes the features of the camera as "a combination of point-and-shoot simplicity, a Guided UI (user interface) to walk new users through the basics of photography, and a Creative Assist mode for more adventurous photographic effects" in addition to "all the manual control you'd expect in a DSLR". In the Guided Mode, texts and illustrations explain what all the different settings are and how to take specific types of images. Digital Photography Review considers the Guided Mode to be one of the distinguishing aspects of the EOS 250D, if compared to other cameras, and calls it "one of the best beginner-friendly guide modes [they've] seen on a camera".

== Gallery ==
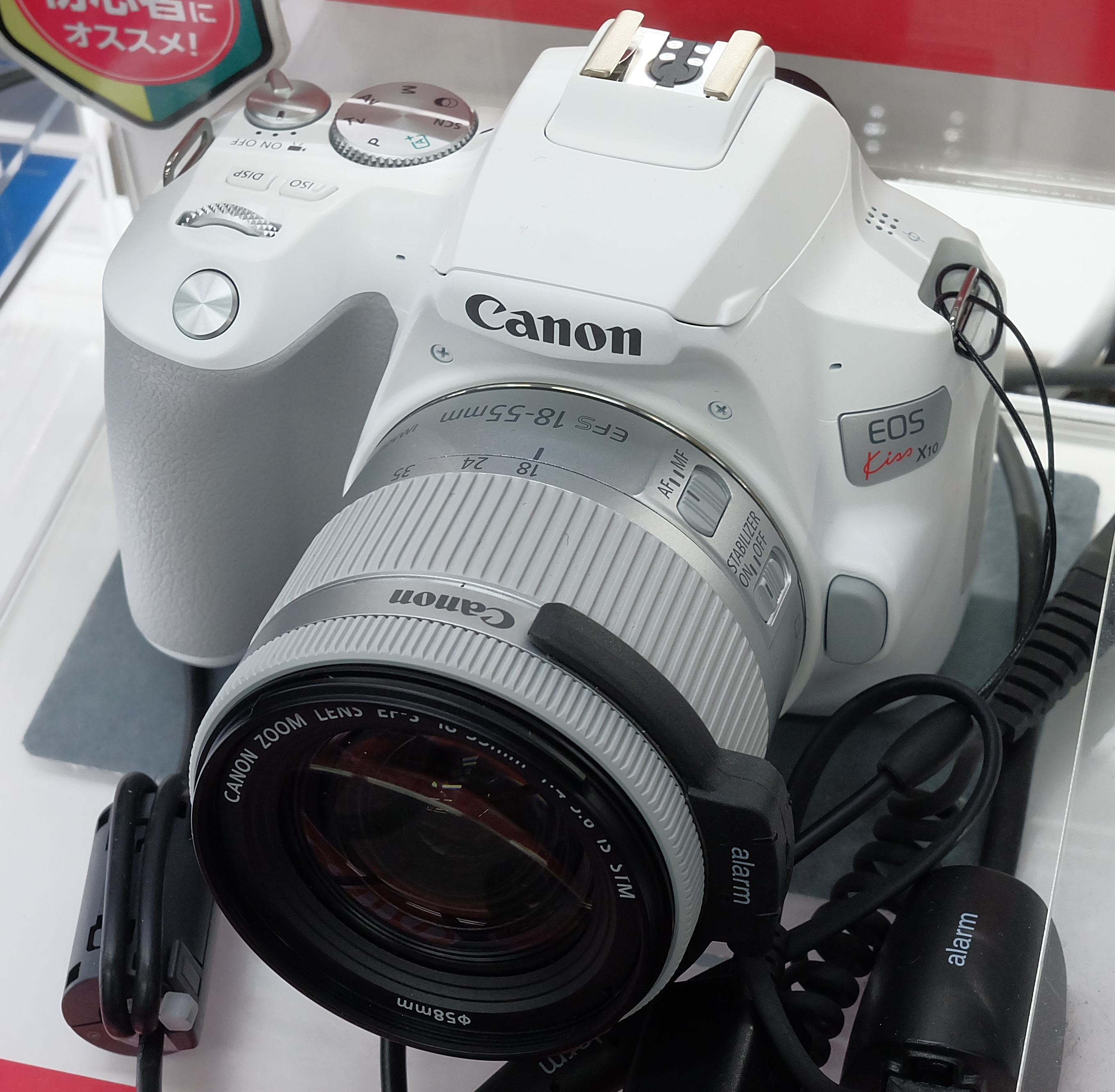
Canon 250D in White

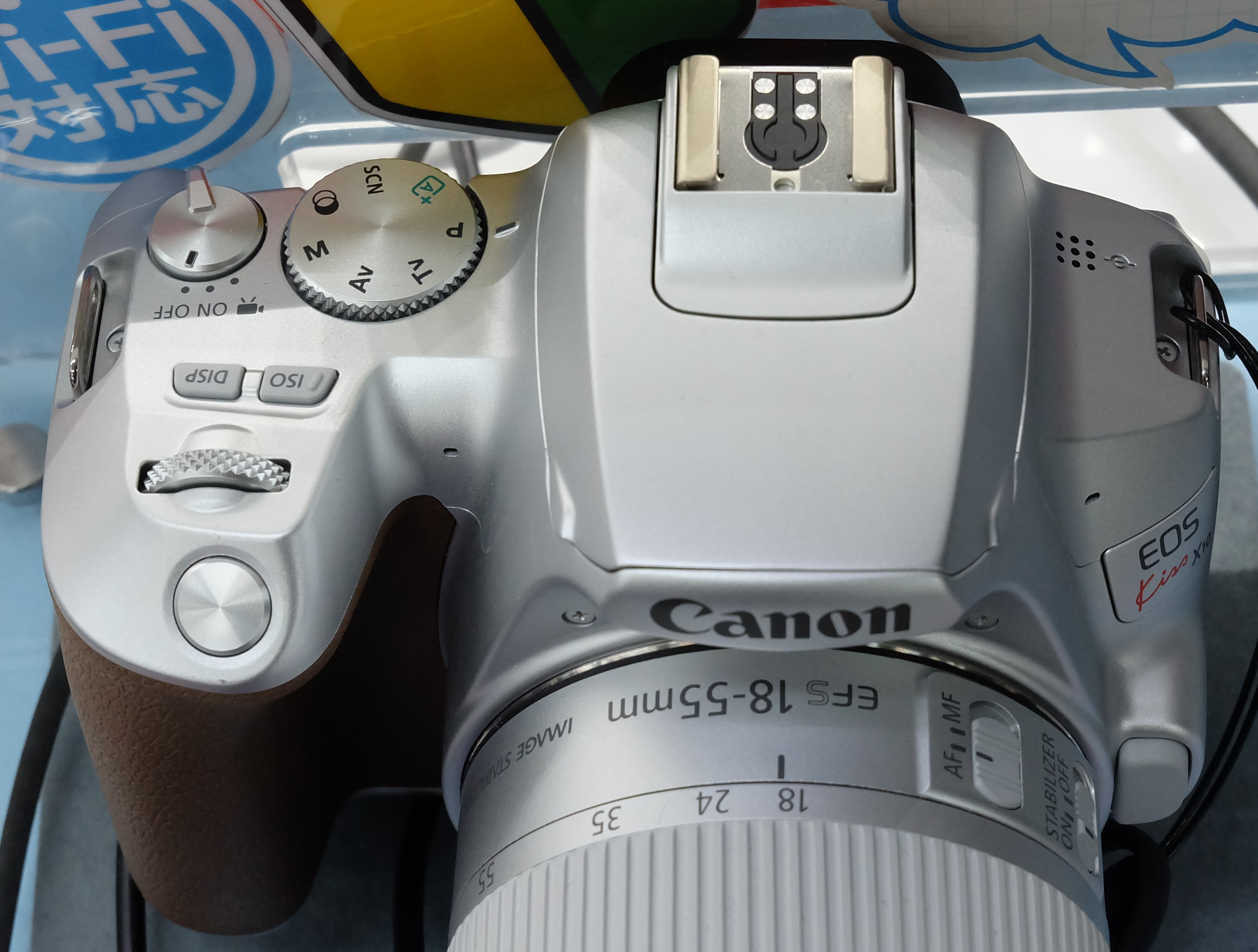
Canon 250D in Silver

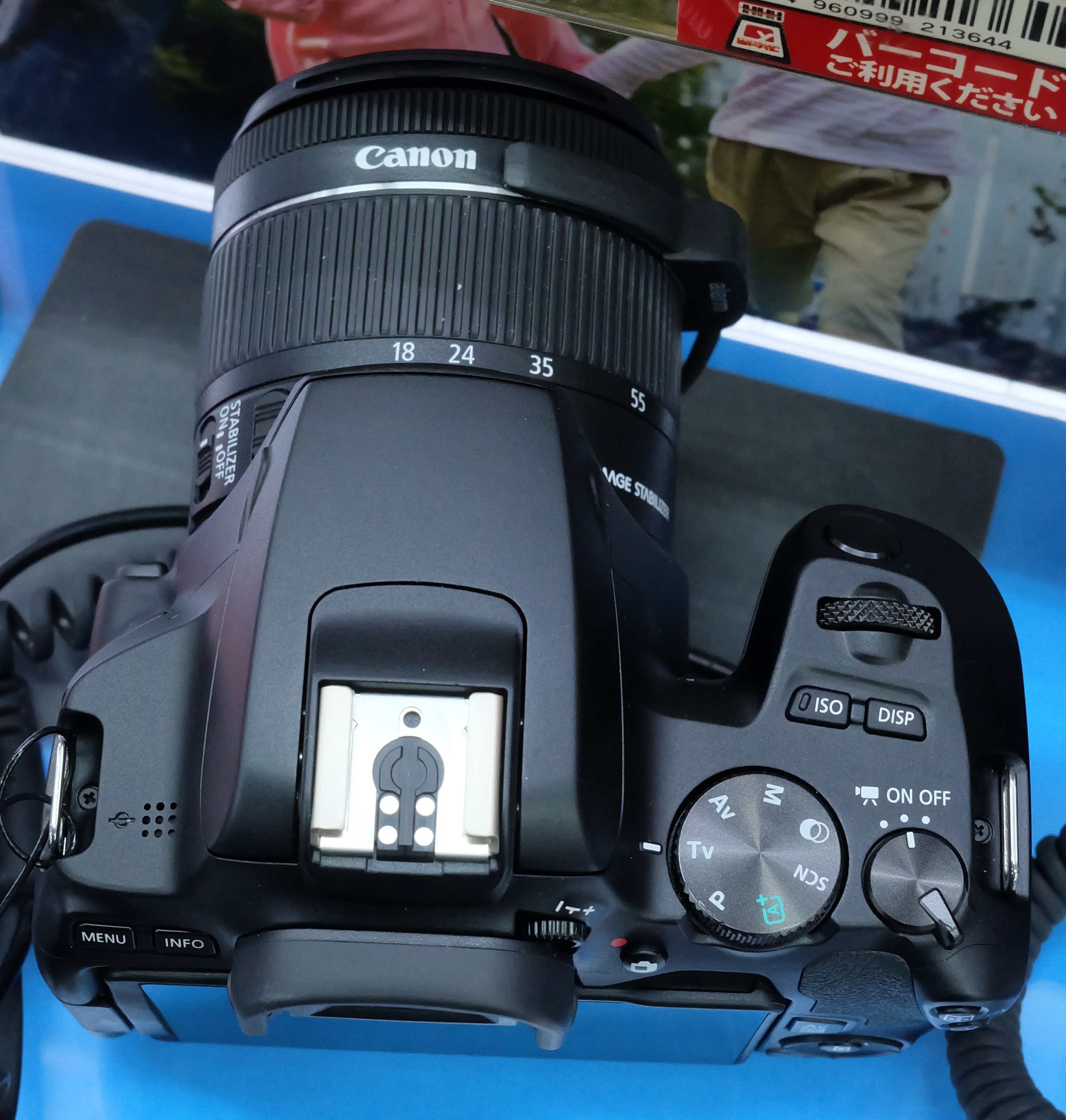
Top

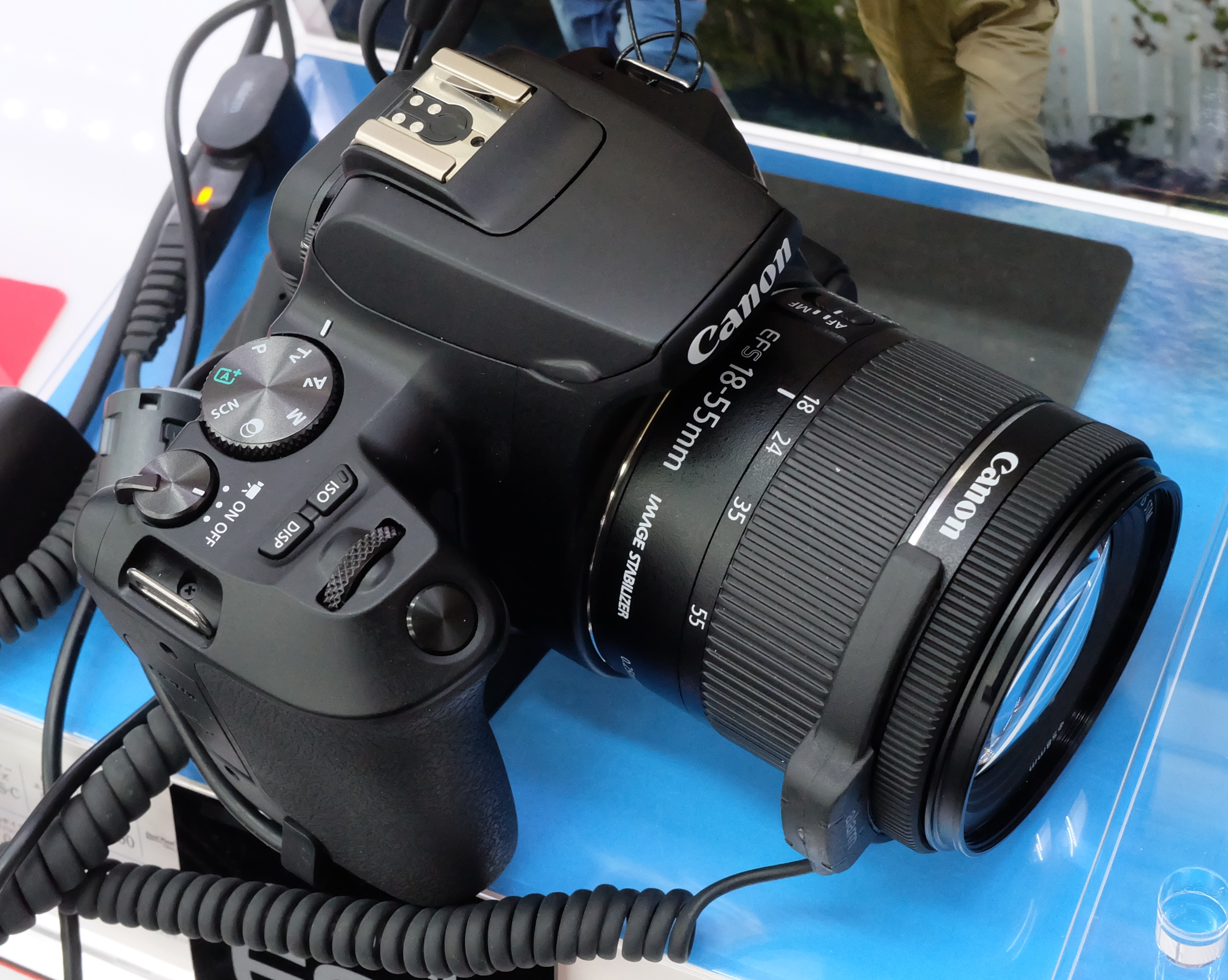
Top Left

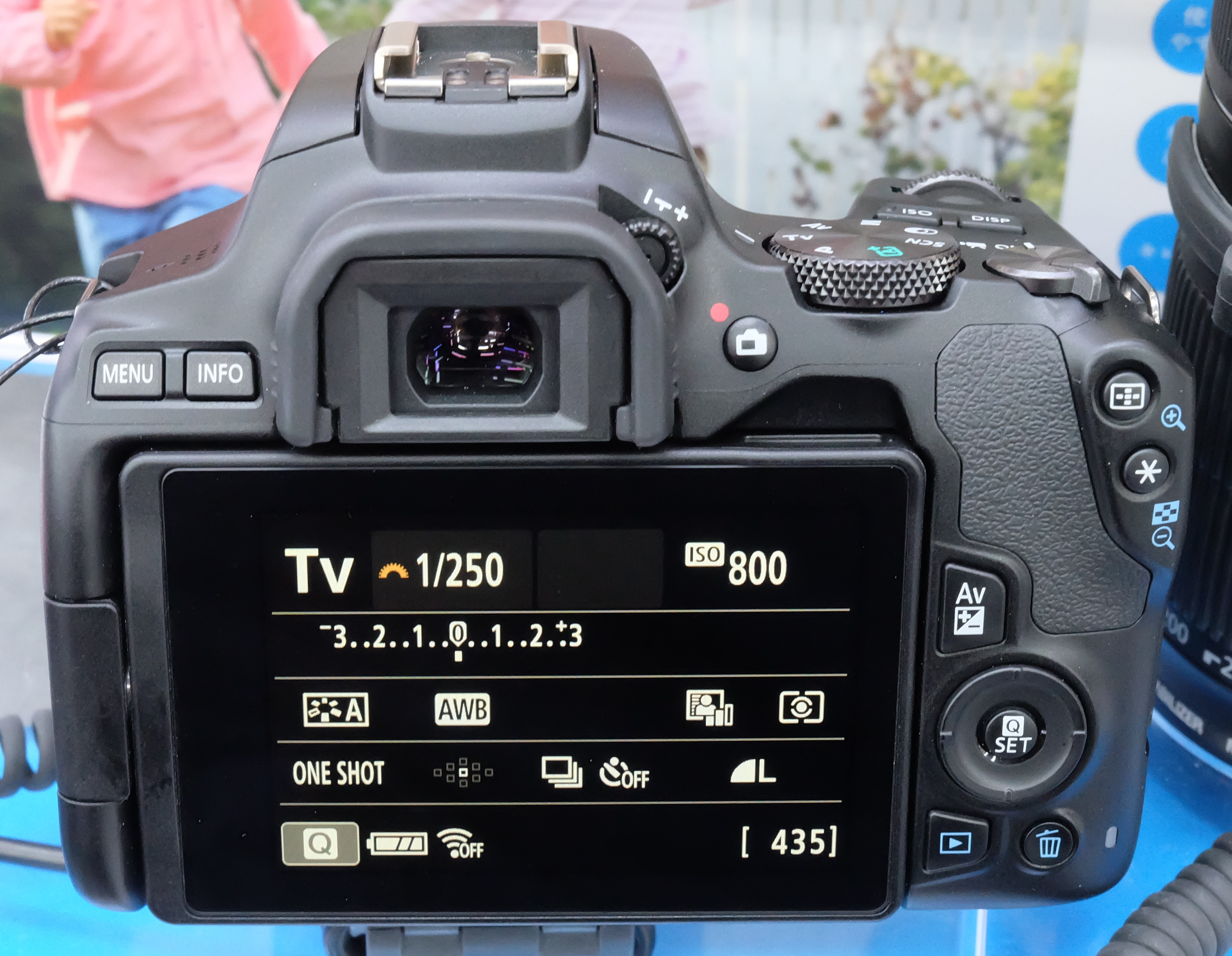
Rear

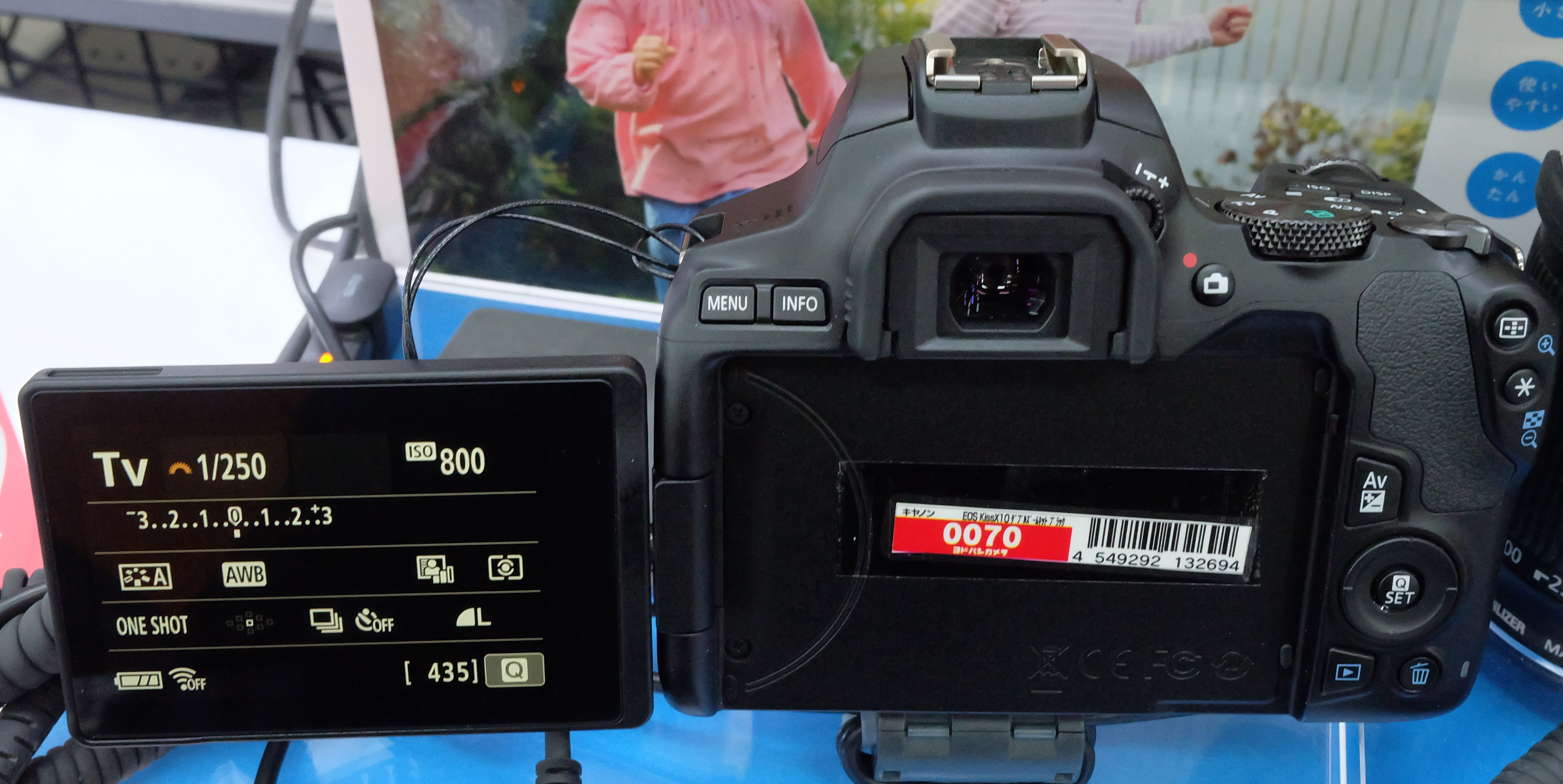
Screen Flip Left

== See also ==
previous very small Canon APS-C DSLR cameras:

- Canon EOS 100D
- Canon EOS 200D

| Type | Sensor | Class | 00 | 01 | 02 | 03 | 04 | 05 | 06 | 07 | 08 | 09 | 10 | 11 | 12 | 13 | 14 | 15 | 16 | 17 | 18 | 19 | 20 | 21 | 22 | 23 | 24 | 25 | 26 |
|---|---|---|---|---|---|---|---|---|---|---|---|---|---|---|---|---|---|---|---|---|---|---|---|---|---|---|---|---|---|
| DSLR | Full-frame | Flagship | | | | 1Ds | | 1Ds Mk II | | | 1Ds Mk III | | | | | 1D C | | | | | | | | | | | | | |
| DSLR | Full-frame | Flagship | | | | 1Ds | | 1Ds Mk II | | | 1Ds Mk III | | | | 1D X | | | | | 1D X Mk II ^{T} | | | 1D X Mk III ^{T} | | | | | | |
| DSLR | APS-H | Flagship | | | 1D | | | 1D Mk II | 1D Mk II N | | 1D Mk III | | 1D Mk IV | | | | | | | | | | | | | | | | |
| DSLR | Full-frame | Professional | | | | | | | | | | | | | | | | | 5DS / 5DS R | | | | | | | | | | |
| DSLR | Full-frame | Professional | | | | | | | 5D | | | _{x} 5D Mk II | | | _{x} 5D Mk III | | | | | 5D Mk IV ^{T} | | | | | | | | | |
| DSLR | Full-frame | Advanced | | | | | | | | | | | | | | _{x} 6D | | | | | _{x} 6D Mk II ^{AT} | | | | | | | | |
| DSLR | APS-C | Advanced | | | | | | | | | | | _{x} 7D | | | | | _{x} 7D Mk II | | | | | | | | | | | |
| DSLR | APS-C | Mid-range | | | | | | 20Da | | | | | | | | _{x} 60Da ^{A} | | | | | | | | | | | | | |
| DSLR | APS-C | Mid-range | | D30 | D60 | 10D | | 20D | 30D | | 40D | _{x} 50D | | _{x} 60D ^{A} | | | _{x} 70D ^{AT} | | 80D ^{AT} | | | | 90D ^{AT} | | | | | | |
| DSLR | APS-C | Mid-range | | | | | | | | | | | | | | | | | 760D ^{AT} | | 77D ^{AT} | | | | | | | | |
| DSLR | APS-C | Entry-level | | | | | 300D | 350D | | 400D | 450D | _{x} 500D | _{x} 550D | _{x} 600D ^{A} | | _{x} 650D ^{AT} | _{x} 700D ^{AT} | | _{x} 750D ^{AT} | | 800D ^{AT} | | | 850D ^{AT} | | | | | |
| DSLR | APS-C | Entry-level | | | | | | | | | | | | | | | _{x} 100D ^{T} | | _{x} 200D ^{AT} | | | | 250D ^{AT} | | | | | | |
| DSLR | APS-C | Entry-level | | | | | | | | | | 1000D | | _{x} 1100D | | | _{x} 1200D | | | 1300D | | 2000D | | | | | | | |
| DSLR | APS-C | Value | | | | | | | | | | | | | | | | | | | | 4000D | | | | | | | |
| Early models | | | Canon EOS DCS 5 (1995); Canon EOS DCS 3 (1995); Canon EOS DCS 1 (1995); Canon EOS D2000 (1998); Canon EOS D6000 (1998) | | | | | | | | | | | | | | | | | | | | | | | | | | |
| Type | Sensor | Spec | | | | | | | | | | | | | | | | | | | | | | | | | | | |
| Type | Sensor | Spec | 00 | 01 | 02 | 03 | 04 | 05 | 06 | 07 | 08 | 09 | 10 | 11 | 12 | 13 | 14 | 15 | 16 | 17 | 18 | 19 | 20 | 21 | 22 | 23 | 24 | 25 | 26 |
