= Pentax DA 21mm Limited lens =

Moderate wide angle camera lens

Pentax smc DA 21mm F3.2 AL Limited
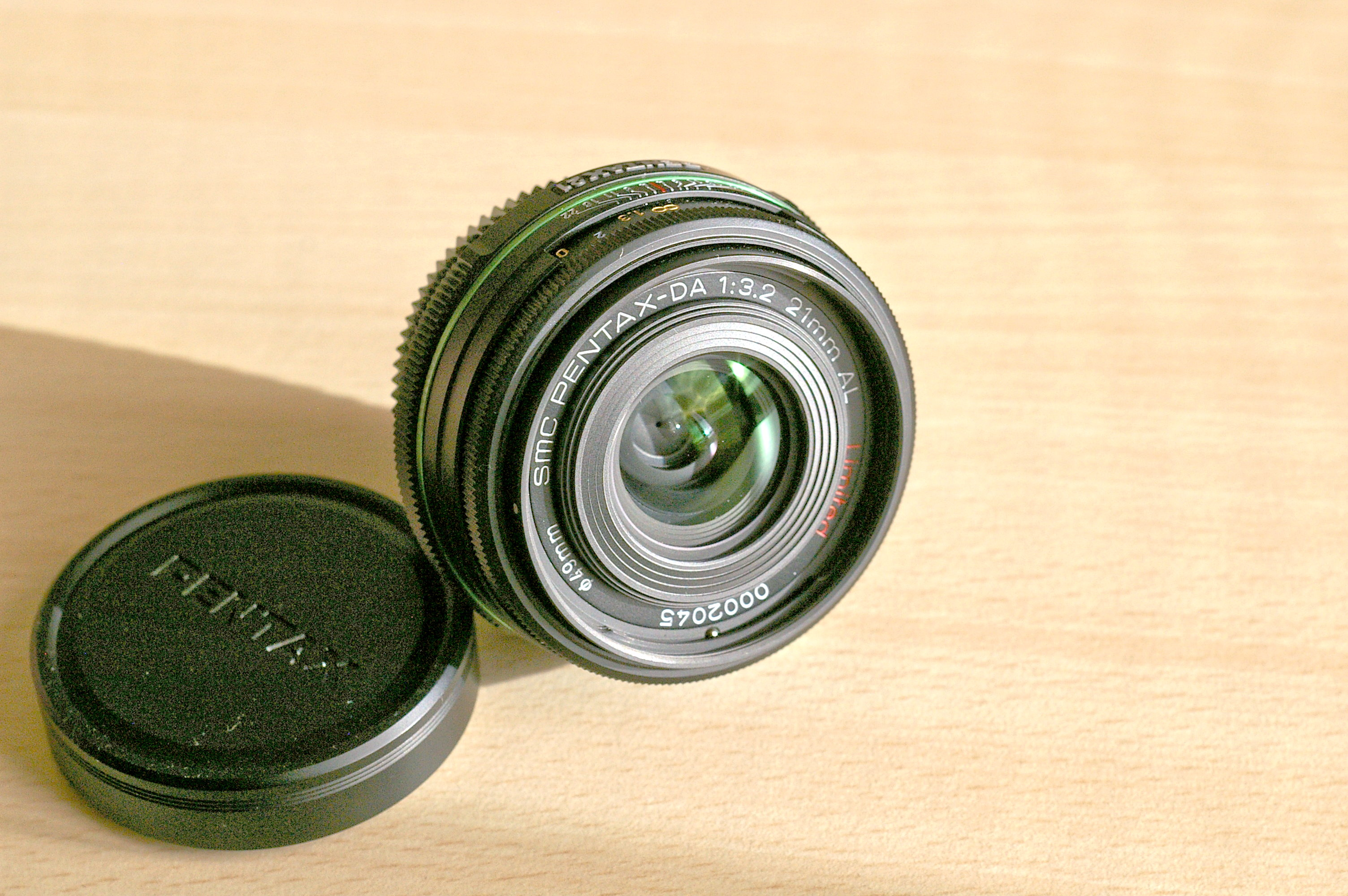
- Maker: Pentax
- Lens mount: Pentax K

Technical data
- Type: Prime
- Focus drive: Screwdrive
- Focal length: 21mm
- Focal length (35mm equiv.): 32mm
- Aperture (max/min): f/3.2
- Close focus distance: 0.20 metres (0.66 ft)
- Max. magnification: 0.17
- Diaphragm blades: 7
- Construction: 8 elements in 5 groups

Features
- Manual focus override: Yes Yes
- Weather-sealing: No No
- Lens-based stabilization: No No
- Aperture ring: No No

Physical
- Max. length: 25 millimetres (0.98 in)
- Diameter: 63 millimetres (2.5 in)
- Weight: 140 grams (0.31 lb)
- Filter diameter: 49mm

History
- Introduction: 2006

The Pentax smc DA 21mm F3.2 AL Limited is a moderate wide angle prime lens announced by Pentax on February 13, 2006. It is one of the five very compact "Limited" prime lenses for APS-C format cameras. Like its siblings, it was replaced in 2013 with a version that is HD-coated and has rounded aperture blades.

== Description ==
The DA 21mm F3.2 AL Limited belongs to Pentax's prestigious "Limited" lens series, which is characterised by premium build quality, compact pancake lens dimensions, and refined optical performance. The lens features an aluminium alloy barrel, giving it a distinctive tactile quality compared to lenses with plastic construction. Its maximum length of just 25 millimetres (0.98 in) makes it one of the thinnest wide-angle prime lenses available for the Pentax K-mount, contributing to a notably compact camera and lens combination when mounted on an APS-C body.

The 21mm focal length corresponds to an equivalent focal length of approximately 32mm on an APS-C sensor (using Pentax's crop factor of 1.53×), placing it close to the normal perspective and making it well suited for street photography, travel, and everyday documentary use. This near-normal field of view is considered by many photographers to be among the most natural and unobtrusive perspectives for candid and street photography.

=== Optical design ===
The lens comprises 8 elements in 5 groups. The designation "AL" in its name indicates the inclusion of at least one aspherical element, which helps control spherical aberration and coma, contributing to sharpness across the frame despite the lens's very small physical size. The diaphragm has 7 blades. The minimum focusing distance of 0.20 metres (0.66 ft) gives a maximum magnification of 0.17×, which is modest but adequate for close detail shots in everyday use.

The smc (Super Multi-Coating) designation indicates Pentax's proprietary multi-layer anti-reflection coating applied to all air-to-glass surfaces, reducing flare and ghosting and improving contrast and colour rendition, particularly when shooting towards or near light sources.

=== Autofocus and handling ===
Autofocus is driven by the camera body's built-in screwdrive motor (also called "body-driven AF"), rather than by a motor in the lens itself. This means the lens is compatible with all autofocus-capable Pentax K-mount bodies, though it does not support silent autofocus on bodies that lack an internal AF motor. The focus ring rotates during autofocus operation, so care should be taken to avoid fingers obstructing the ring. Manual focus override (MFO) is supported, allowing the photographer to adjust focus manually without switching the camera out of autofocus mode; the manual focusing action has been described as smooth and well damped.

Focusing is not performed internally, meaning the lens barrel extends slightly — by approximately 5 millimetres (0.20 in) — when focused to the minimum distance. Despite this, the filter thread does not rotate, making the lens compatible with polarising and graduated filters without the need to reorient them after focusing. A hyperfocal distance scale is engraved on the lens barrel.

=== Image quality ===
Reviewers have noted that the lens delivers very good sharpness in the centre of the frame at maximum aperture, with outstanding corner-to-corner sharpness when stopped down to around f/8. The lens has been described as mechanically well engineered and giving good resolution results across the frame and aperture range, though not regarded as exceptional among wide-angle options of its era. Community reviews on specialised Pentax forums have consistently praised it as a well-liked and popular compact prime within the Pentax ecosystem.

== Limited series ==
The DA 21mm F3.2 AL Limited is part of the Pentax DA Limited series, a family of compact, high-quality prime lenses designed specifically for APS-C digital cameras. The other lenses in the original DA Limited series include the DA 15mm F4 ED AL Limited, DA 35mm F2.8 Macro Limited, DA 40mm F2.8 Limited, and DA 70mm F2.4 Limited. All share the same aluminium barrel construction, the same premium fit and finish, and the same philosophy of prioritising compactness and optical refinement over maximum aperture.

In 2013, Pentax replaced the entire DA Limited series — including the 21mm — with updated versions carrying the "HD" designation. The HD versions feature Pentax's newer HD (High Definition) nano-technology coating, which provides improved anti-reflection performance compared to the earlier smc coating: the HD coatings are claimed to reduce reflectance by more than 50% compared to conventional coatings, thereby reducing flare and ghosting and increasing light transmittance. The updated versions also feature rounded aperture blades for improved bokeh rendition, replacing the straight-bladed diaphragm of the original. In all other optical and mechanical respects, the HD version is substantially the same as the original smc model.

== See also ==
- Pentax K-mount
- Pancake lens
- APS-C
- Prime lens
