= Canon EOS 100D =

2013 APS-C digital single-lens reflex camera

Canon EOS 100D Canon EOS Rebel SL1 Canon EOS Kiss X7
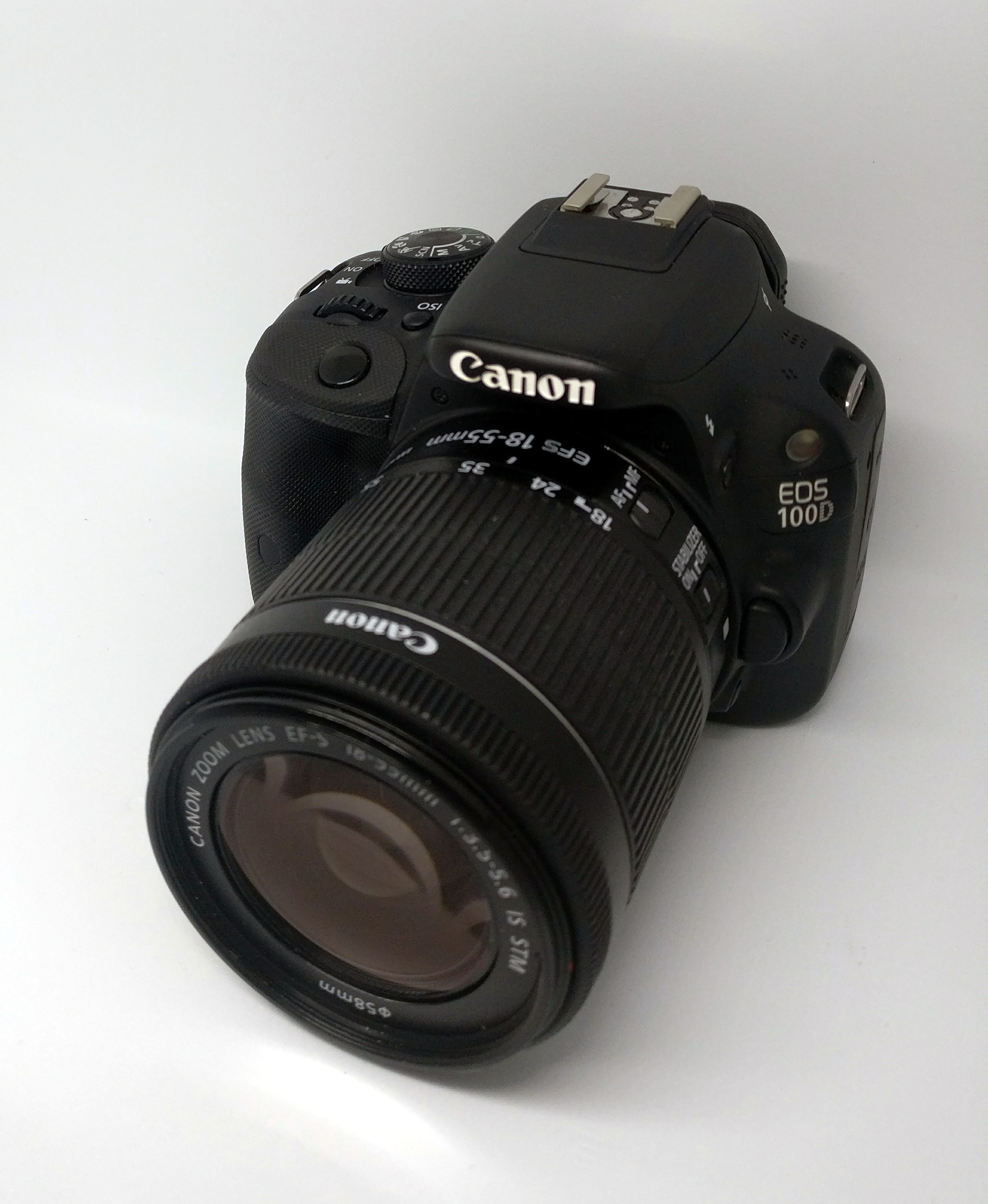

Overview
- Maker: Canon Inc.
- Type: Digital single-lens reflex camera

Lens
- Lens mount: Canon EF
- Lens: Interchangeable (EF / EF-S)

Sensor/medium
- Sensor type: CMOS
- Sensor size: 22.3 × 14.9 mm (APS-C format)
- Maximum resolution: 5184 × 3456 (18.0 effective megapixels)
- Film speed: 100 – 12800 (expandable to H: 25600)
- Storage media: SD/SDHC/SDXC card (UHS-I bus supported)

Focusing
- Focus modes: Evaluative, Partial, Spot, Centre-weighted Average
- Focus areas: 9 AF points, 1 cross type (center)

Exposure/metering
- Exposure modes: Scene Intelligent Auto, Flash Off, Creative Auto, Portrait, Landscape, Close-up, Sports, Special Scenes (Night Portrait, Handheld Night Scene, HDR Backlight Control, Kids, Foods, Candlelight), Program AE, Shutter priority AE, Aperture priority AE, Manual Exposure, Movie
- Exposure metering: Full aperture TTL, 63 zones iFCL SPC
- Metering modes: Evaluative, Partial, Spot, Centre-weighted Average

Flash
- Flash: E-TTL II auto-pop-up built-in / External
- Flash bracketing: Yes, with external flash

Shutter
- Shutter: Electronic focal-plane
- Shutter speed range: 1/4000 sec. – 30 sec. and Bulb; X-sync at 1/200 sec.
- Continuous shooting: 4.0 fps for 28 JPEG frames or for 7 RAW frames

Viewfinder
- Viewfinder: Eye-level pentamirror with 95% coverage and 0.87x magnification / LCD (Live View)

Image processing
- Image processor: DIGIC 5
- White balance: Auto, Daylight, Shade, Cloudy, Tungsten, White Fluorescent, Flash, Custom

General
- LCD screen: 3.0" (7.7 cm) Clear View II colour TFT touchscreen LCD with 1,040,000 dots
- Battery: Lithium-Ion LP-E12 rechargeable
- Dimensions: 116.8 mm × 90.7 mm × 69.4 mm (4.60 in × 3.57 in × 2.73 in) (W x H x D)
- Weight: 407 g (14.4 oz) (CIPA standard)
- Made in: Taiwan / Japan

Chronology
- Successor: Canon EOS 200D

The Canon EOS 100D, known as the EOS Rebel SL1 in the Americas and EOS Kiss X7 in Japan, is an 18.0-megapixel digital single-lens reflex camera announced by Canon on 21 March 2013. It has been described as the "world's smallest and lightest DSLR camera", either currently in production or in the APS-C format. Canon uses a smaller version of the APS-C sensor format than some other manufacturers including Nikon, Pentax, and Sony, with a crop factor of 1.6 rather than 1.5. It weighs 407 grams including battery and memory card.

The successor of the EOS 100D is the EOS 200D.

== Features ==
The EOS 100D shares a similar set of features with the larger Canon EOS 700D. However, it does have an improved focus tracking system in live view mode called Hybrid CMOS AF II with 80% frame coverage. The 700D has the previous version of Hybrid CMOS AF with much reduced frame coverage.

Features include:

- 18.0 effective megapixel APS-C CMOS sensor
- DIGIC 5 image processor with 14-bit processing
- 95% viewfinder frame coverage with 0.87x magnification
- 1080p HD video recording at 24p, 25p (25 Hz) and 30p (29.97 Hz) with drop frame timing
- 720p HD video recording at 50p (50 Hz) and 60p (59.94 Hz)
- 480p ED video recording at 30p and 25p
- 4.0 frames per second continuous shooting
- 3" Clear View II LCD touchscreen with 1.04-megapixel resolution. The 100D has a fixed screen (unlike the articulated screen of the 700D and that camera's immediate predecessors, the 650D and 600D).
- 3.5 mm microphone jack for external microphones or recorders
- 9-point autofocus sensors with 1 cross type sensor in center
- The 100D model is also available in white body color. To go together with it the two lenses were produced also in white color: EF-S 18-55mm STM and EF 40mm.

Type	Sensor	Class	00	01	02	03	04	05	06	07	08	09	10	11	12	13	14	15	16	17	18	19	20	21	22	23	24	25	26
DSLR	Full-frame	Flagship				1Ds		1Ds Mk II			1Ds Mk III					1D C													
DSLR	Full-frame	Flagship				1Ds		1Ds Mk II			1Ds Mk III				1D X					1D X Mk II ^{T}			1D X Mk III ^{T}						
DSLR	APS-H	Flagship			1D			1D Mk II	1D Mk II N		1D Mk III		1D Mk IV																
DSLR	Full-frame	Professional																	5DS / 5DS R										
DSLR	Full-frame	Professional							5D			_{x} 5D Mk II			_{x} 5D Mk III					5D Mk IV ^{T}									
DSLR	Full-frame	Advanced														_{x} 6D					_{x} 6D Mk II ^{AT}								
DSLR	APS-C	Advanced											_{x} 7D					_{x} 7D Mk II											
DSLR	APS-C	Mid-range						20Da								_{x} 60Da ^{A}													
DSLR	APS-C	Mid-range		D30	D60	10D		20D	30D		40D	_{x} 50D		_{x} 60D ^{A}			_{x} 70D ^{AT}		80D ^{AT}				90D ^{AT}						
DSLR	APS-C	Mid-range																	760D ^{AT}		77D ^{AT}								
DSLR	APS-C	Entry-level					300D	350D		400D	450D	_{x} 500D	_{x} 550D	_{x} 600D ^{A}		_{x} 650D ^{AT}	_{x} 700D ^{AT}		_{x} 750D ^{AT}		800D ^{AT}			850D ^{AT}					
DSLR	APS-C	Entry-level															_{x} 100D ^{T}		_{x} 200D ^{AT}				250D ^{AT}						
DSLR	APS-C	Entry-level										1000D		_{x} 1100D			_{x} 1200D			1300D		2000D							
DSLR	APS-C	Value																				4000D							
Early models			Canon EOS DCS 5 (1995); Canon EOS DCS 3 (1995); Canon EOS DCS 1 (1995); Canon EOS D2000 (1998); Canon EOS D6000 (1998)																										
Type	Sensor	Spec																											
Type	Sensor	Spec	00	01	02	03	04	05	06	07	08	09	10	11	12	13	14	15	16	17	18	19	20	21	22	23	24	25	26
