= Olympus M.Zuiko Digital 17mm f/2.8 =

M.Zuiko Digital 17mm
- Maker: Olympus Corporation

Technical data
- Type: Prime
- Focal length: 17mm
- Focal length (35mm equiv.): 34mm
- Aperture (max/min): f/2.8 - 22
- Close focus distance: 0.2m (7.87 in)
- Max. magnification: 0.11
- Diaphragm blades: 5, rounded
- Construction: 6 elements in 4 groups

Features
- Ultrasonic motor: No No
- Lens-based stabilization: No No
- Macro capable: No No
- Application: Wide

Physical
- Max. length: 22 mm (0.87 in)
- Diameter: 57 mm (2.24 in)
- Weight: 71g (2.5 oz)
- Filter diameter: Ø37mm

Angle of view
- Diagonal: 65 deg.

History
- Introduction: 2009

The M.Zuiko Digital 17 mm f/2.8 is a wide-angle, pancake-style prime lens by Olympus Corporation, for the Micro Four Thirds System. It is sold in a kit with the Olympus PEN E-P1 camera body and available separately.

The optical scheme has 7 lenses in four groups; two of these lenses are aspherical. Different reviews and tests valued the total optical quality as moderate to good, but far from superior. Still, the compactness and total performance make some good reputation for this kit lens.

This lens is one of the few not billed by Olympus as Movie and Still Compatible ("MSC"), due to noise generated by its focus motor.
