= Fujinon XF 27mm F2.8 =

- Maker: Fujifilm
- Lens mount(s): Fujifilm X

Technical data
- Type: Prime
- Focus drive: Micromotor
- Focal length: 27mm
- Aperture (max/min): f/2.8
- Close focus distance: 0.34 metres (1.1 ft)
- Max. magnification: 0.1
- Diaphragm blades: 7
- Construction: 7 elements in 5 groups

Features
- Manual focus override: Yes Yes
- Weather-sealing: No No
- Lens-based stabilization: No No
- Aperture ring: No No

Physical
- Max. length: 23 millimetres (0.91 in)
- Diameter: 61 millimetres (2.4 in)
- Weight: 78 grams (0.172 lb)
- Filter diameter: 39mm

History
- Introduction: 2013

The Fujinon XF 27mm F2.8 is an interchangeable camera pancake lens announced by Fujifilm on June 25, 2013. At 27 mm, it has a 35 mm equivalent focal length of 41 mm, making it a normal lens of maximum aperture f/2.8. The intended benefit of this lens is its extreme compact size, extending only 23 mm (0.91 in) from the flange, and light weight, only 77.3 g (2.73 oz), with the trade-off of having no aperture ring.

In 2021, an updated version of this lens called the XF 27mm F2.8 R WR was released. It has the same length and optical construction as the original, while adding an aperture ring (R) and weather resistance (WR).
