= Pentax DA 40mm lens =

smc Pentax-DA 40mm f/2.8 Limited
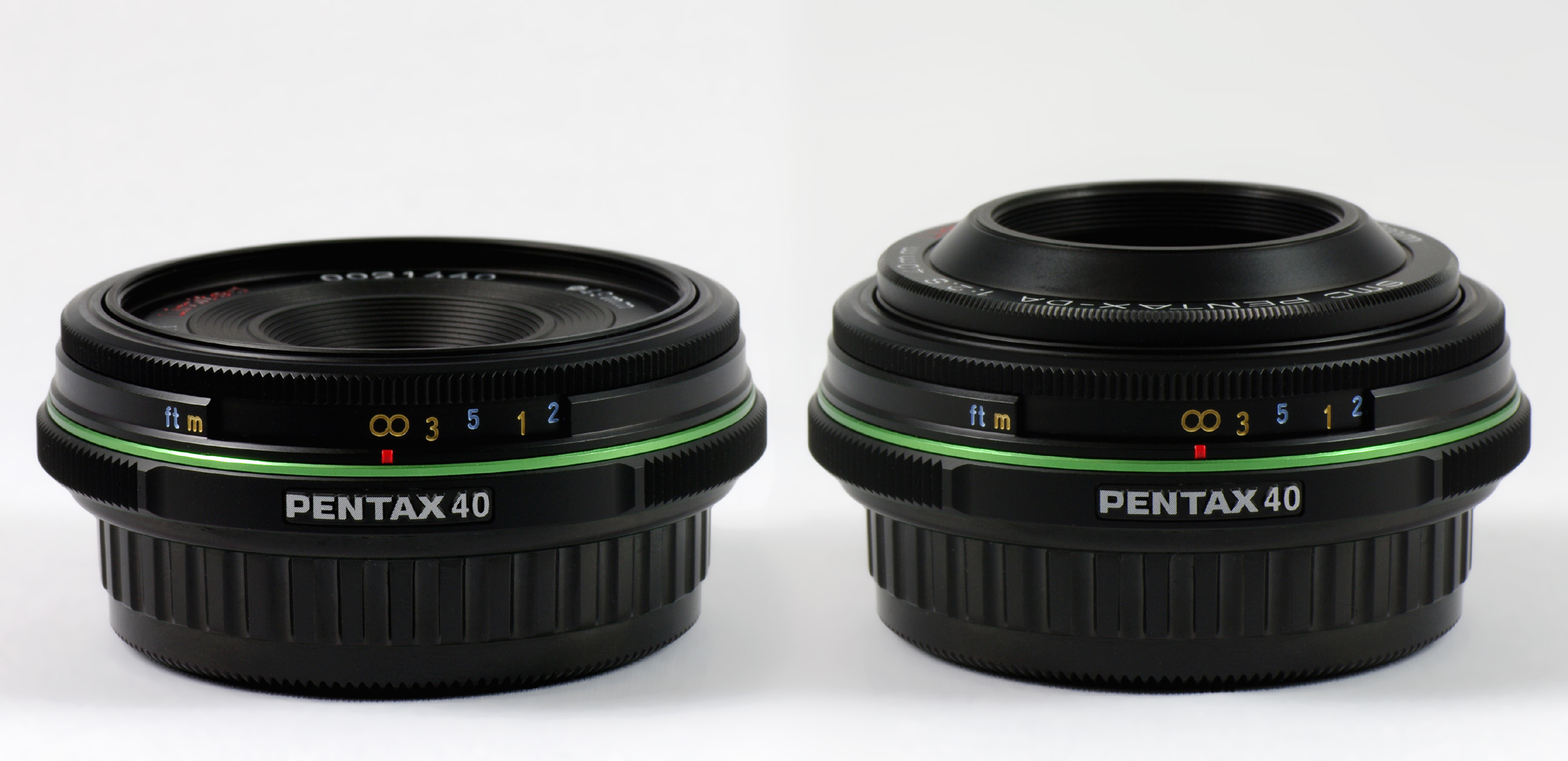
- Maker: Pentax

Technical data
- Type: Prime
- Focal length: 40mm
- Focal length (35mm equiv.): 60mm
- Crop factor: 1.5
- Aperture (max/min): f/2.8 / f/22
- Close focus distance: 15.7 inches (0.40 m)
- Max. magnification: 0.13x
- Diaphragm blades: 9
- Construction: 5 elements in 4 groups

Features
- Manual focus override: Yes Yes
- Unique features: Pancake lens
- Application: Normal lens

Physical
- Max. length: 0.6 inches (15 mm)
- Diameter: 2.5 inches (64 mm)
- Weight: 3.2 oz (91 g)
- Filter diameter: 49mm (30.5mm on hood)

Accessories
- Lens hood: MH-RC 49mm
- Case: DA 40mm Lens Soft Case

Angle of view
- Diagonal: 39°

History
- Introduction: 2004

Retail info
- MSRP: 499.95 USD

== DA 40mm f/2.8 Limited ==
The smc Pentax-DA 40mm f/2.8 Limited is a pancake lens for the Pentax K-mount. At only 0.6 inches (15 mm) long, it was the smallest lens made by Pentax until the 40mm XS lens was introduced. The lens has a 35mm equivalent focal length of 60mm; it is part of the Limited series of high-performance compact lenses. In August 2013 it was re-released with improved lens coatings and rounded aperture blades as HD Pentax-DA 40mm f/2.8 Limited.

== DA 40mm f/2.8 XS ==
The SMC Pentax-DA 40mm f/2.8 XS is an even thinner version of the SMC DA 40mm lens, at 9.1 millimetres (0.36 in) thick, released by Pentax on February 2, 2012. It features an aesthetic design by Marc Newson to match the Pentax K-01. It is currently one of the thinnest autofocus pancake lenses ever made.

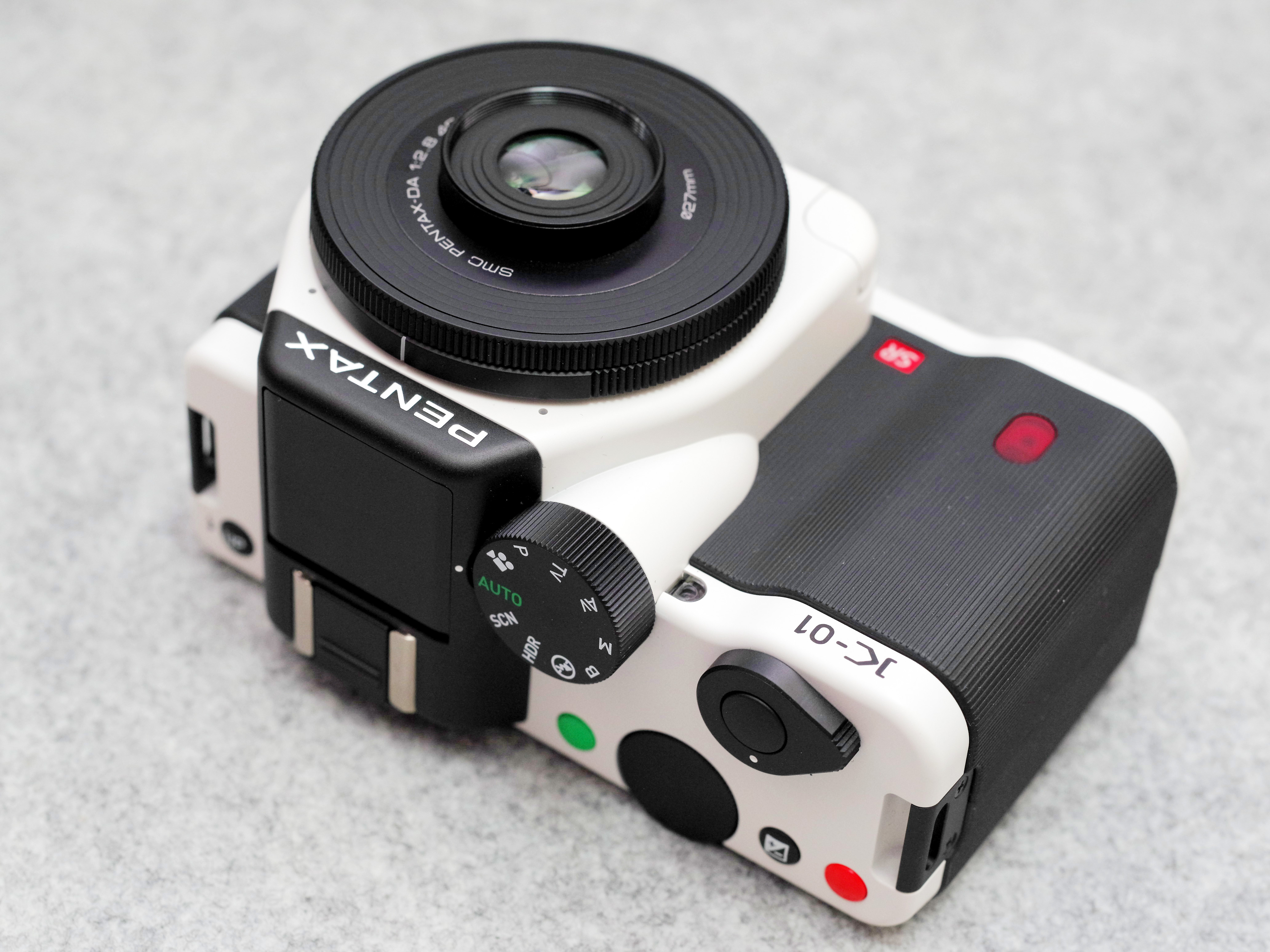
DA 40mm f2.8 XS mounted on Pentax K-01
