= Canon EOS 200D =

2017 APS-C digital single-lens reflex camera

Canon EOS 200D Canon EOS Rebel SL2 Canon EOS Kiss X9
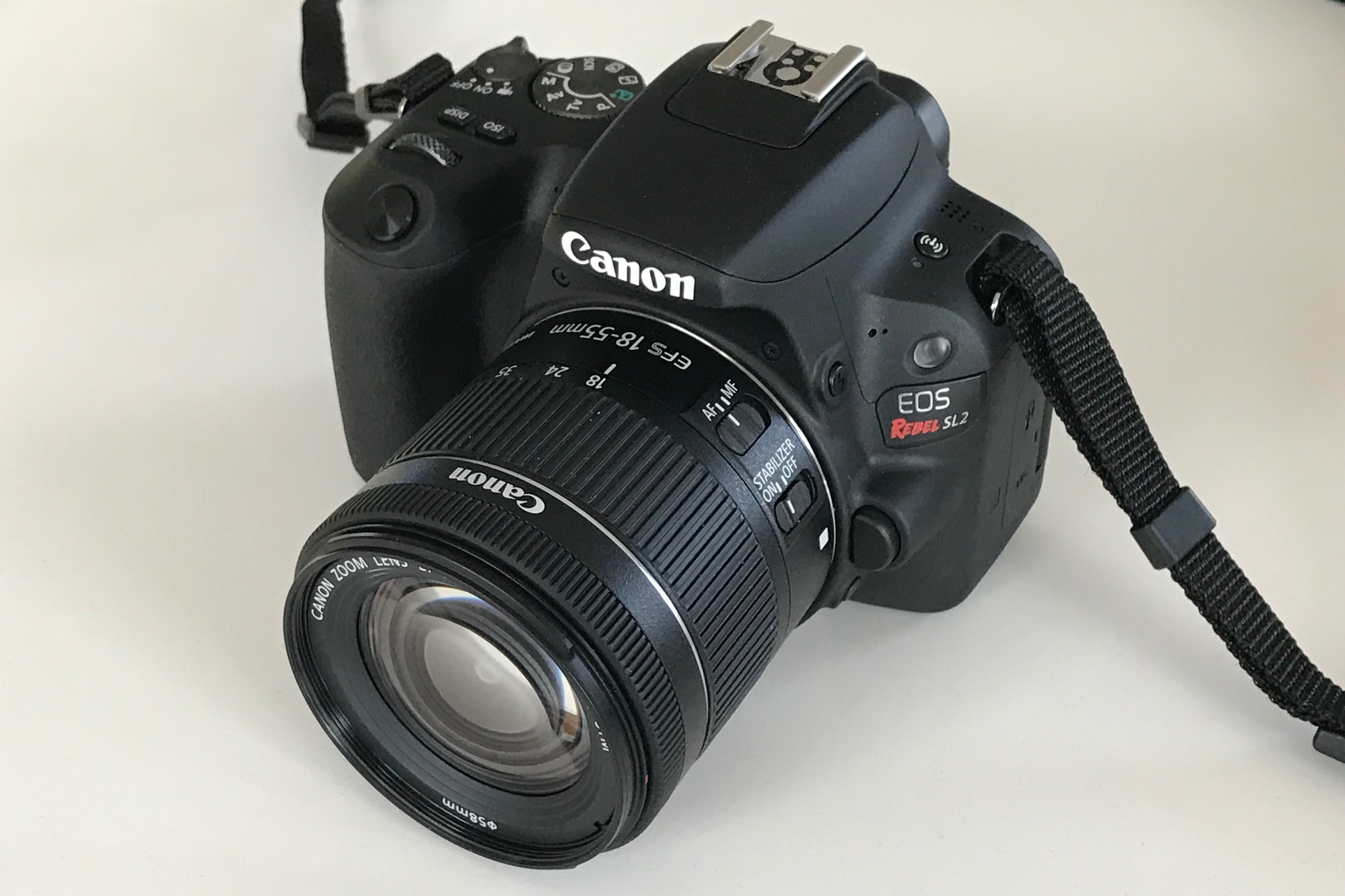
- Canon 200D with Kit Lens

Overview
- Maker: Canon Inc.
- Type: Digital single-lens reflex

Lens
- Lens mount: Canon EF-S
- Lens: Interchangeable

Sensor/medium
- Sensor type: CMOS
- Sensor size: 22.3×14.9 mm
- Maximum resolution: Approx. 24.20 megapixels
- Storage media: SD/SDHC/SDXC (UHS Speed Class 1 compatible)

Focusing
- Focus areas: 9 AF points, 1 cross type (center)

Exposure/metering
- Exposure metering: 63 zone dual-layer, Via Optical Viewfinder
- Metering modes: Evaluative, Partial, Spot, Centre-weighted Average

Flash
- Flash: Built-in Pop-up Flash, external flash connector available

Shutter
- Shutter: Electronic
- Shutter speed range: 30-1/4000 sec (1/2 or 1/3 stop increments), Bulb (Total shutter speed range. Available range varies by shooting mode)
- Continuous shooting: 5fps

Viewfinder
- Viewfinder: Fixed eye-level pentamirror
- Frame coverage: 95%

Image processing
- Image processor: DIGIC 7

General
- Video recording: MP4 (Video: H.264 inter frame, Sound: Linear PCM / AAC, recording level can be manually adjusted by user). 1920 x 1080 (59.94, 50 fps) inter-frame. 1280 x 720 (59.94, 50 fps) inter-frame (for more movie sizes, see "official page")
- LCD screen: Vari angle touchscreen 7.7 cm (3.0") 3:2, approx. 1040 K RGB dots
- Battery: Rechargeable Li-ion Battery LP-E17
- Dimensions: 122×93×70 mm (4.8×3.7×2.8 in)
- Weight: 453 g (16 oz) (CIPA)
- Made in: Taiwan

Chronology
- Predecessor: Canon EOS 100D
- Successor: Canon EOS 250D

The Canon EOS 200D, known as the EOS Rebel SL2 in the Americas and EOS Kiss X9 in Japan, is a 24.2-megapixel upper entry-level midrange digital single-lens reflex camera made by Canon. It was announced on 28 June 2017, with a suggested retail price of US$549 for the body and US$699 with the Canon EF-S 18-55m f/4-5.6 IS STM lens. The European release price is significantly higher, at €599 for the body only, the equivalent of $671 at current conversion rates (but this price may include VAT).

The model features an APS-C CMOS sensor, Dual Pixel CMOS AF, DIGIC 7 image processor, ISO 100-25600 range, optical viewfinder with a 9-point AF system, 7.7 cm (3.0 inch) 1040k dot articulated touchscreen, 1080p60 video with microphone input, and built-in Wi-Fi, NFC, and Bluetooth. It became available in July 2017, alongside Canon's parallel announcement of the 6D Mk II. It weighs 453 grams, including battery and memory card.

== Features ==
The Canon 200D shares a similar set of features with the Canon EOS 100D. Both models are the smallest DSLR cameras produced by Canon, described as "the smallest and lightest DSLR" and are upper entry-level DSLRs. However, the 200D has the improved Dual-pixel CMOS AF system and the improved DIGIC 7 image processor.

Features include:

- 24.2 effective megapixel APS-C CMOS sensor
- DIGIC 7 image processor
- Continuous Shooting Speed of 5 fps
- ISO sensitivity 100–25600, expandable to 51200
- 9-point AF system, with centre point AF cross type
- 3-inch touch-screen monitor
- Liveview Mode, 100% coverage
- Pop-up flash

== See also ==
- Canon EOS 100D
- Canon EOS 250D
- Canon EOS 300D
- Canon EOS 5D Mark II

| Type | Sensor | Class | 00 | 01 | 02 | 03 | 04 | 05 | 06 | 07 | 08 | 09 | 10 | 11 | 12 | 13 | 14 | 15 | 16 | 17 | 18 | 19 | 20 | 21 | 22 | 23 | 24 | 25 | 26 |
|---|---|---|---|---|---|---|---|---|---|---|---|---|---|---|---|---|---|---|---|---|---|---|---|---|---|---|---|---|---|
| DSLR | Full-frame | Flagship | | | | 1Ds | | 1Ds Mk II | | | 1Ds Mk III | | | | | 1D C | | | | | | | | | | | | | |
| DSLR | Full-frame | Flagship | | | | 1Ds | | 1Ds Mk II | | | 1Ds Mk III | | | | 1D X | | | | | 1D X Mk II ^{T} | | | 1D X Mk III ^{T} | | | | | | |
| DSLR | APS-H | Flagship | | | 1D | | | 1D Mk II | 1D Mk II N | | 1D Mk III | | 1D Mk IV | | | | | | | | | | | | | | | | |
| DSLR | Full-frame | Professional | | | | | | | | | | | | | | | | | 5DS / 5DS R | | | | | | | | | | |
| DSLR | Full-frame | Professional | | | | | | | 5D | | | _{x} 5D Mk II | | | _{x} 5D Mk III | | | | | 5D Mk IV ^{T} | | | | | | | | | |
| DSLR | Full-frame | Advanced | | | | | | | | | | | | | | _{x} 6D | | | | | _{x} 6D Mk II ^{AT} | | | | | | | | |
| DSLR | APS-C | Advanced | | | | | | | | | | | _{x} 7D | | | | | _{x} 7D Mk II | | | | | | | | | | | |
| DSLR | APS-C | Mid-range | | | | | | 20Da | | | | | | | | _{x} 60Da ^{A} | | | | | | | | | | | | | |
| DSLR | APS-C | Mid-range | | D30 | D60 | 10D | | 20D | 30D | | 40D | _{x} 50D | | _{x} 60D ^{A} | | | _{x} 70D ^{AT} | | 80D ^{AT} | | | | 90D ^{AT} | | | | | | |
| DSLR | APS-C | Mid-range | | | | | | | | | | | | | | | | | 760D ^{AT} | | 77D ^{AT} | | | | | | | | |
| DSLR | APS-C | Entry-level | | | | | 300D | 350D | | 400D | 450D | _{x} 500D | _{x} 550D | _{x} 600D ^{A} | | _{x} 650D ^{AT} | _{x} 700D ^{AT} | | _{x} 750D ^{AT} | | 800D ^{AT} | | | 850D ^{AT} | | | | | |
| DSLR | APS-C | Entry-level | | | | | | | | | | | | | | | _{x} 100D ^{T} | | _{x} 200D ^{AT} | | | | 250D ^{AT} | | | | | | |
| DSLR | APS-C | Entry-level | | | | | | | | | | 1000D | | _{x} 1100D | | | _{x} 1200D | | | 1300D | | 2000D | | | | | | | |
| DSLR | APS-C | Value | | | | | | | | | | | | | | | | | | | | 4000D | | | | | | | |
| Early models | | | Canon EOS DCS 5 (1995); Canon EOS DCS 3 (1995); Canon EOS DCS 1 (1995); Canon EOS D2000 (1998); Canon EOS D6000 (1998) | | | | | | | | | | | | | | | | | | | | | | | | | | |
| Type | Sensor | Spec | | | | | | | | | | | | | | | | | | | | | | | | | | | |
| Type | Sensor | Spec | 00 | 01 | 02 | 03 | 04 | 05 | 06 | 07 | 08 | 09 | 10 | 11 | 12 | 13 | 14 | 15 | 16 | 17 | 18 | 19 | 20 | 21 | 22 | 23 | 24 | 25 | 26 |
