= Canon EF 40mm lens =

EF40mm f/2.8 STM
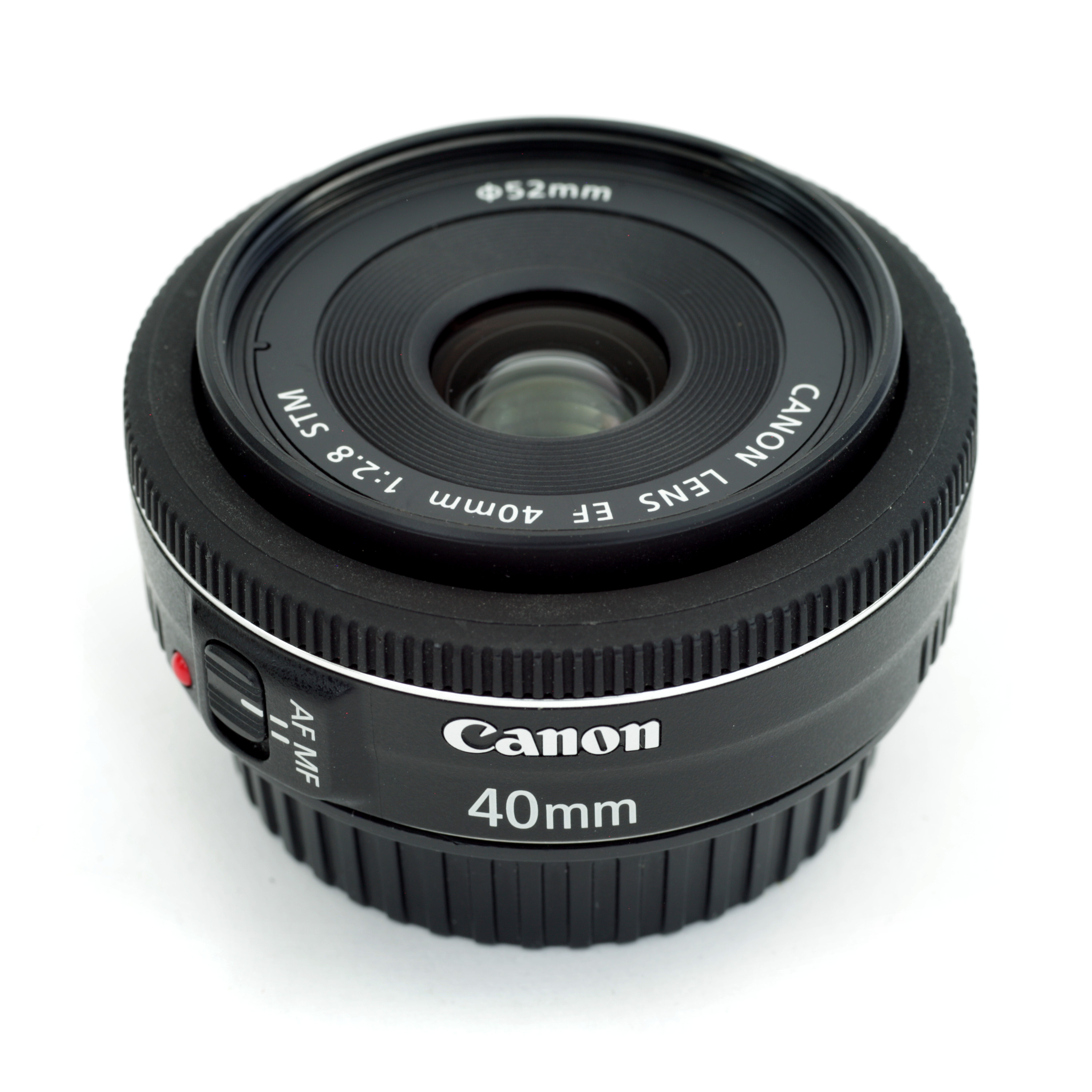
- EF40mm f/2.8 STM pancake lens
- Maker: Canon

Technical data
- Type: Standard Prime lens
- Focus drive: Stepping motor
- Focal length: 40 mm
- Aperture (max/min): f/ 2.8 - f/ 22
- Close focus distance: 0.98 ft./0.30m
- Max. magnification: 0.18x
- Diaphragm blades: 7
- Construction: 6 elements in 4 groups

Features
- Short back focus: No No
- Lens-based stabilization: No No
- Macro capable: No No
- Unique features: Pancake lens
- Application: video, general

Physical
- Max. length: 0.9 inch / 22.8mm
- Diameter: 2.7 inch / 68.2mm
- Weight: 4.6 oz. / 130g
- Filter diameter: 52mm

Accessories
- Lens hood: ES-52

Angle of view
- Horizontal: 49°
- Vertical: 34°
- Diagonal: 57°

History
- Introduction: 2012
- Discontinuation: 2021

Retail info
- MSRP: 199 USD

The EF40mm f/2.8 STM was a standard prime lens which was introduced by Canon in June 2012, alongside the EOS 650D/Kiss X6i/Rebel T4i. The lens features a maximum aperture of f/2.8. It was Canon's first EF pancake lens. The EF 40mm was the first EF lens equipped with a stepping motor (STM). It was discontinued in March 2021.

== See also ==
- Pancake lens
