= Olympus M.Zuiko Digital 17mm f/1.8 =

M.Zuiko Digital 17mm f1.8
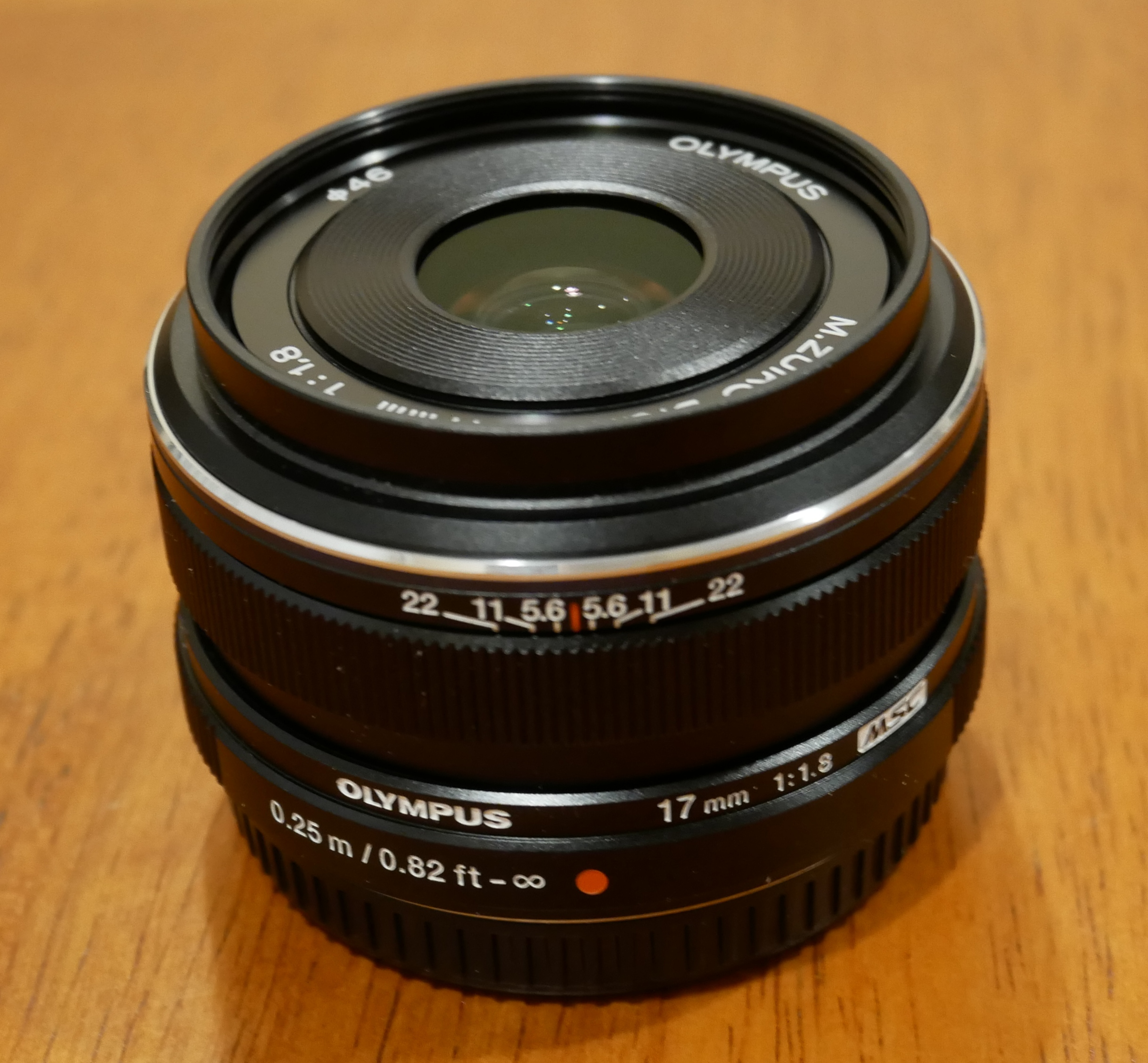
- Maker: Olympus Corporation

Technical data
- Type: Prime
- Aperture (max/min): f/1.8 - 22
- Close focus distance: 0.25m
- Max. magnification: 0.08x
- Construction: 9 elements in 6 groups

Features
- Lens-based stabilization: No No
- Macro capable: No No

Physical
- Max. length: 35.5 mm (1.40 in)
- Diameter: 57.5 mm (2.26 in)
- Weight: 120g
- Filter diameter: Ø46 mm

Accessories
- Lens hood: optional
- Case: optional

Angle of view
- Diagonal: 65°

History
- Introduction: 2012

Retail info
- MSRP: $500 (US) USD

The M.Zuiko Digital 17 mm f/1.8 is a prime lens by Olympus Corporation, for the Micro Four Thirds System. Originally introduced in 2012, the lens features a silent movies and still compatible focusing motor. The lens, like some other Olympus lenses, can switch from auto focus to manual focus by pulling back in its focusing ring.

== Reviews ==
Steve Huff feels that the lens has a "beautiful character" that is neither too sharp nor too smooth. He also feels its out-of-focus areas (its bokeh) is attractive, and that it's a solidly constructed lens. Brendan Nystedt, writing for Reviewed.com, observed that, while sharp in the centers, the corners were not sharp. He felt the out of focus areas were pleasing but could be better. The Phoblographer, in their review, said that the lens has very fast focus, is a compact and lightweight lens, and has a solid build with the possible exception of its focusing ring. In addition, they said that the image quality was good, but colors lacked punch.
