= Panasonic Lumix 20mm lens =

Lumix 20mm
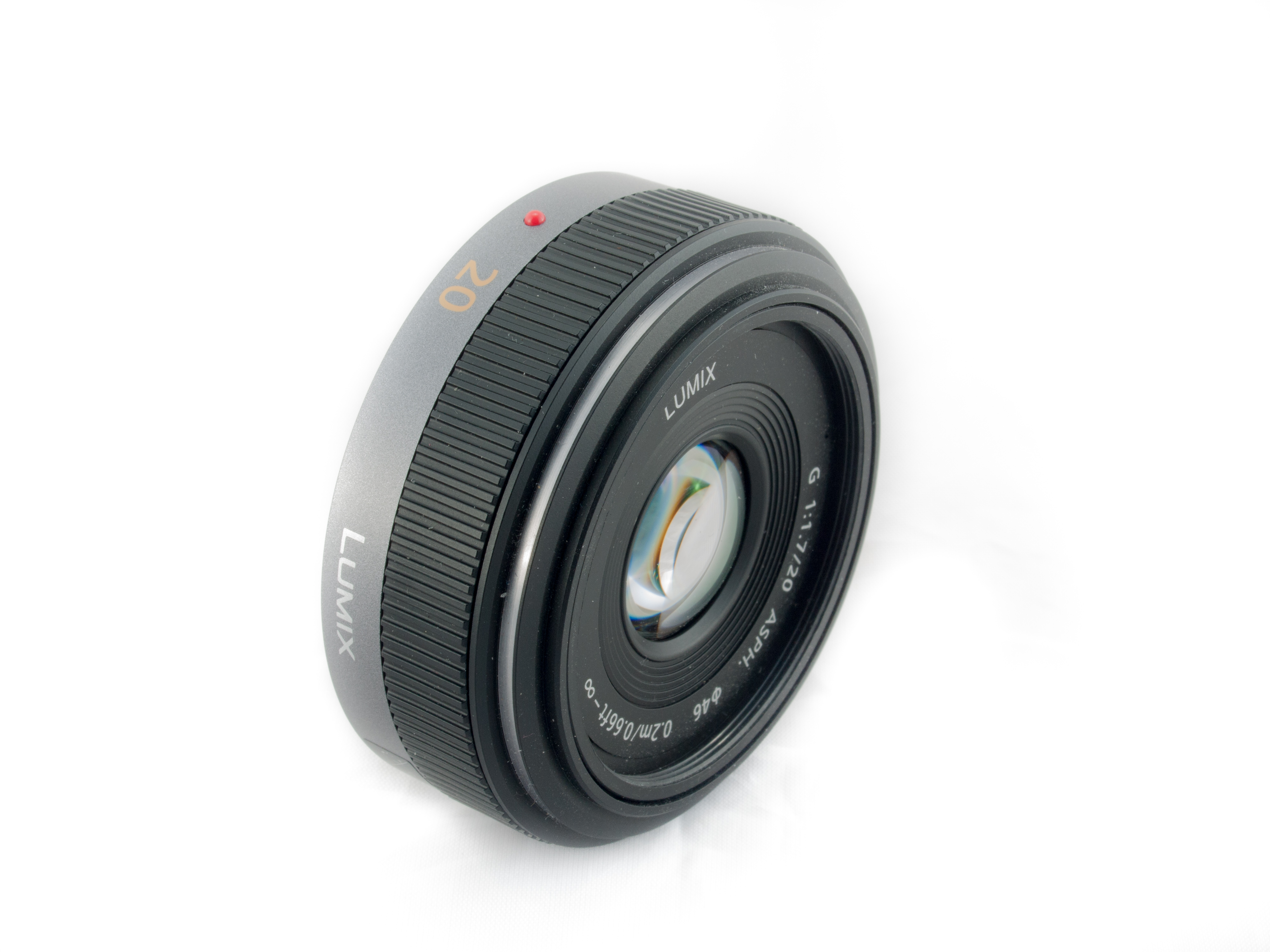
- Maker: Panasonic
- Lens mount(s): Micro Four Thirds
- Part number: H-H020

Technical data
- Focal length: 20mm
- Focal length (35mm equiv.): 40mm
- Aperture (max/min): f/1.7 - f/16
- Close focus distance: 0.2 m (7.87 in)
- Max. magnification: 0.13
- Construction: 7 elements in 5 groups

Features
- Lens-based stabilization: No No
- Macro capable: No No

Physical
- Max. length: 25.5 mm (1.0 in)
- Diameter: 63 mm (2.48 in)
- Weight: 100g (3.53 oz)
- Filter diameter: 46mm

History
- Introduction: 2009

The Panasonic Lumix G 20mm F1.7 lens is a pancake-style prime lens for Micro Four Thirds system cameras. In the Micro Four Thirds format, it is slightly wider than normal. It was the prime-lens option available with the GF1.

The lens is "focus by wire"- the focusing ring sends commands, while the actual actuation is via a motor, even for manual focus. The front element does not rotate, allowing the consistent use of polarized filters. The 46mm thread lets a Micro Four Thirds user share filters between it, the Panasonic 14mm, Panasonic Leica 25mm, and Panasonic Leica 45mm lenses.

Focusing shifts all lens elements by the same amount, increasing the length of the lens slightly at close focus distances.

The lens is very favorably reviewed , including descriptions as a "must have" or "must own" lens. Praise centres on its small size and excellent sharpness. Criticisms include the use of software correction of distortion, and that the focusing motor is slower and noisier than lenses intended for video ("MSC"- movie and stills compatible).

In 2013, an updated version of this lens called the Panasonic Lumix G 20mm F1.7 II was released. It has the same length and optical construction as the original, but it is lighter at 87 grams and has a different exterior design.

== Issues ==
The Panasonic 20mm F1.7 produces noticeable banding in photos, when used in high ISO, in conjunction with many but not all bodies. This effect is accentuated when the aperture is closed. It is believed that this is due to interaction between the aperture stepper motor on the lens and the Sony 16MP sensor used on many Micro 4/3 cameras.
