= Sony E 16mm F2.8 =

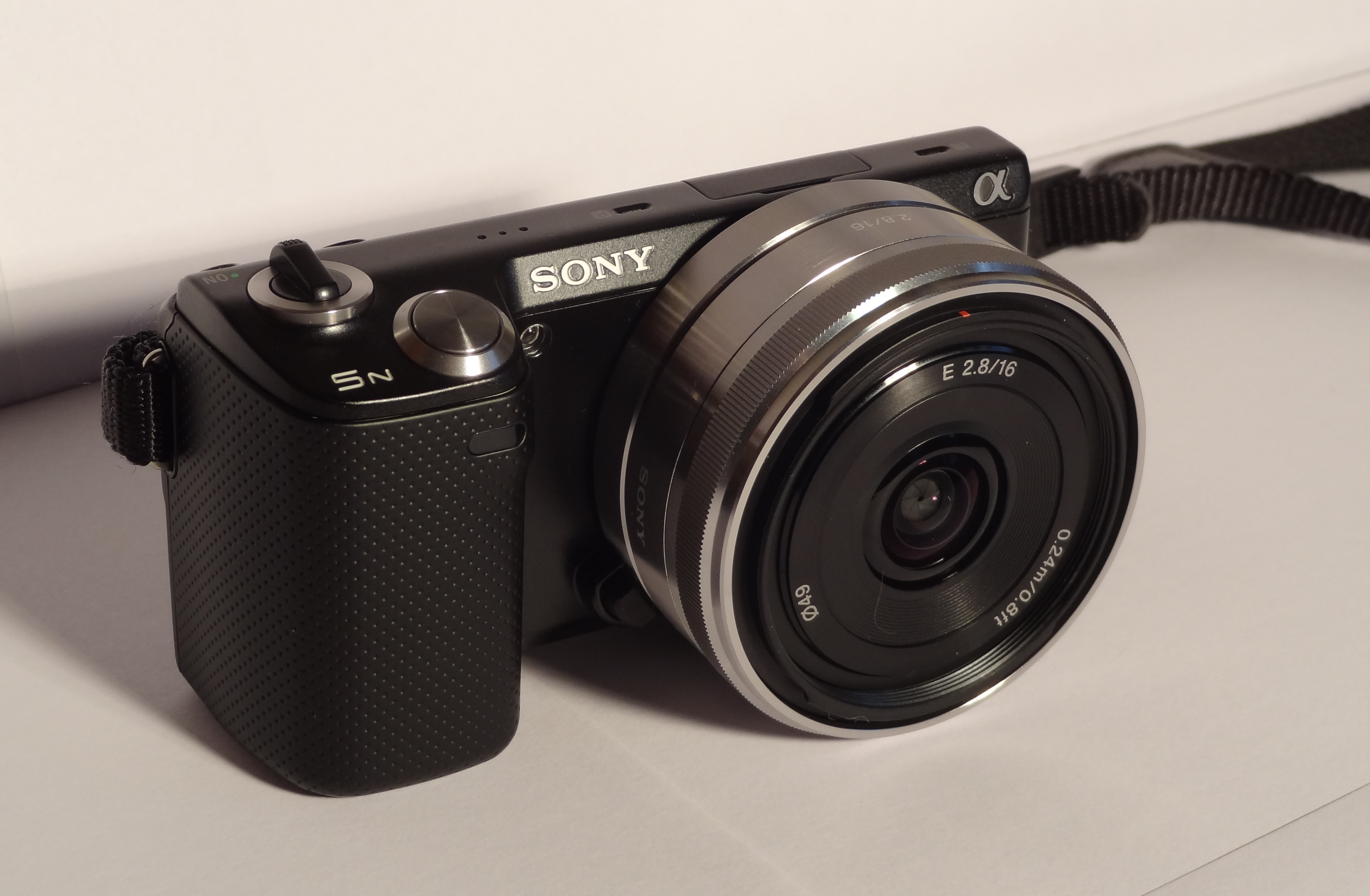
- Sony 16mm lens mounted to the NEX-5N.
- Maker: Sony
- Lens mount: Sony E-mount

Technical data
- Type: Prime
- Focus drive: Stepper motor
- Focal length: 16mm
- Focal length (35mm equiv.): 24mm
- Image format: APS-C
- Aperture (max/min): f/2.8 - 22.0
- Close focus distance: 0.24 metres (0.79 ft)
- Max. magnification: 1:14 (0.073x)
- Diaphragm blades: 7
- Construction: 5 elements in 5 groups

Features
- Manual focus override: Yes Yes
- Weather-sealing: No No
- Lens-based stabilization: No No
- Aperture ring: No No
- Unique features: Pancake lens
- Application: Landscape

Physical
- Max. length: 22.6 millimetres (0.89 in)
- Diameter: 62.0 millimetres (2.44 in)
- Weight: 70 grams (0.15 lb)
- Filter diameter: 49mm

Accessories
- Lens hood: None

History
- Introduction: 2011

Retail info
- MSRP: $248 USD

The Sony E 16mm F2.8 is a wide-angle prime lens for the Sony E-mount, announced by Sony on June 11, 2010.

Despite featuring the shortest focal length of any prime lens manufactured by Sony at the time of release, the 16mm lens is infamous for its strong barrel distortion, heavy chromatic aberration, and overall image softness. However, some of this can be digitally corrected in the camera.

The lens can also be adapted with a 12mm ultra-wide angle or a 10mm fisheye converter, which are both sold separately from the lens itself.

== See also ==
- List of Sony E-mount lenses
