= Olympus M.Zuiko Digital ED 12mm f/2 =

Micro Four Thirds System Prime lens by Olympus Corporation

- Maker: Olympus Corporation

Technical data
- Type: Prime
- Focal length: 12mm
- Focal length (35mm equiv.): 24mm
- Aperture (max/min): f/2.0 - 22
- Close focus distance: 0.2m (7.9 in)
- Max. magnification: 0.08
- Diaphragm blades: 7, round
- Construction: 11 elements in 8 groups

Features
- Lens-based stabilization: No No
- Macro capable: No No

Physical
- Max. length: 43 mm (1.7 in)
- Diameter: 56 mm (2.2 in)
- Weight: 130g (4.6 oz)
- Filter diameter: Ø46mm

Angle of view
- Diagonal: 84 deg.

History
- Introduction: 2011

The Olympus M.Zuiko Digital ED 12mm f/2 is a Micro Four Thirds System Prime lens by Olympus Corporation. In the Micro Four Thirds format, it is a wide- or ultra-wide lens.

The lens is focus-by-wire, using the autofocus motor even for manual focus. The motor is quiet, and suitable for video use ("MSC"- movie and stills compatible). Unlike other focus-by-wire systems, the lens offers two manual focus modes. In the traditional focus-by-wire mode, the focus mechanism operates like other Micro Four Thirds lenses. The focus ring can be moved to engage a "snap focus" mode, which displays a distance scale for zone focusing, and provides a feel similar to mechanical focus systems. The "snap focus" mode makes this the first auto-focus capable Micro Four Thirds lens with a distance scale. The front element does not rotate, allowing the consistent use of polarized filters; a 46mm filter thread lets users share filters with many of Panasonic's lenses.

Early reviews are positive, with good sharpness and build quality.
