= Panasonic Lumix 45mm lens =

Lumix 45mm
- Maker: Panasonic

Technical data
- Type: Macro
- Focal length: 45mm
- Focal length (35mm equiv.): 90mm
- Aperture (max/min): f/2.8 - f/22
- Close focus distance: 0.15 m (5.91 in)
- Max. magnification: 1.0
- Construction: 14 elements in 10 groups

Features
- Lens-based stabilization: Yes Yes
- Macro capable: Yes Yes

Physical
- Max. length: 62.5 mm (2.46 in)
- Diameter: 63 mm (2.48 in)
- Weight: 380g (12.4 oz)
- Filter diameter: 46 mm

History
- Introduction: 2009

The Panasonic Lumix 45mm f/2.8 lens is a macro lens for Micro Four Thirds system cameras. It is co-branded between Leica and Panasonic, built in Japan under Leica management.

The lens has a hardware stabilization switch ("Mega OIS" in Panasonic branding). It also has a switch for focal range, to reduce focus hunting when macro capability is not needed.

Focusing is internal, so polarizing filters can be used consistently. The 46mm thread lets a Micro Four Thirds user share filters between it, the Panasonic 14mm, Panasonic 20mm, and Panasonic Leica 25mm & 15mm lenses.
