= Panasonic Lumix G Vario 45–200mm lens =

Lumix 45–200mm
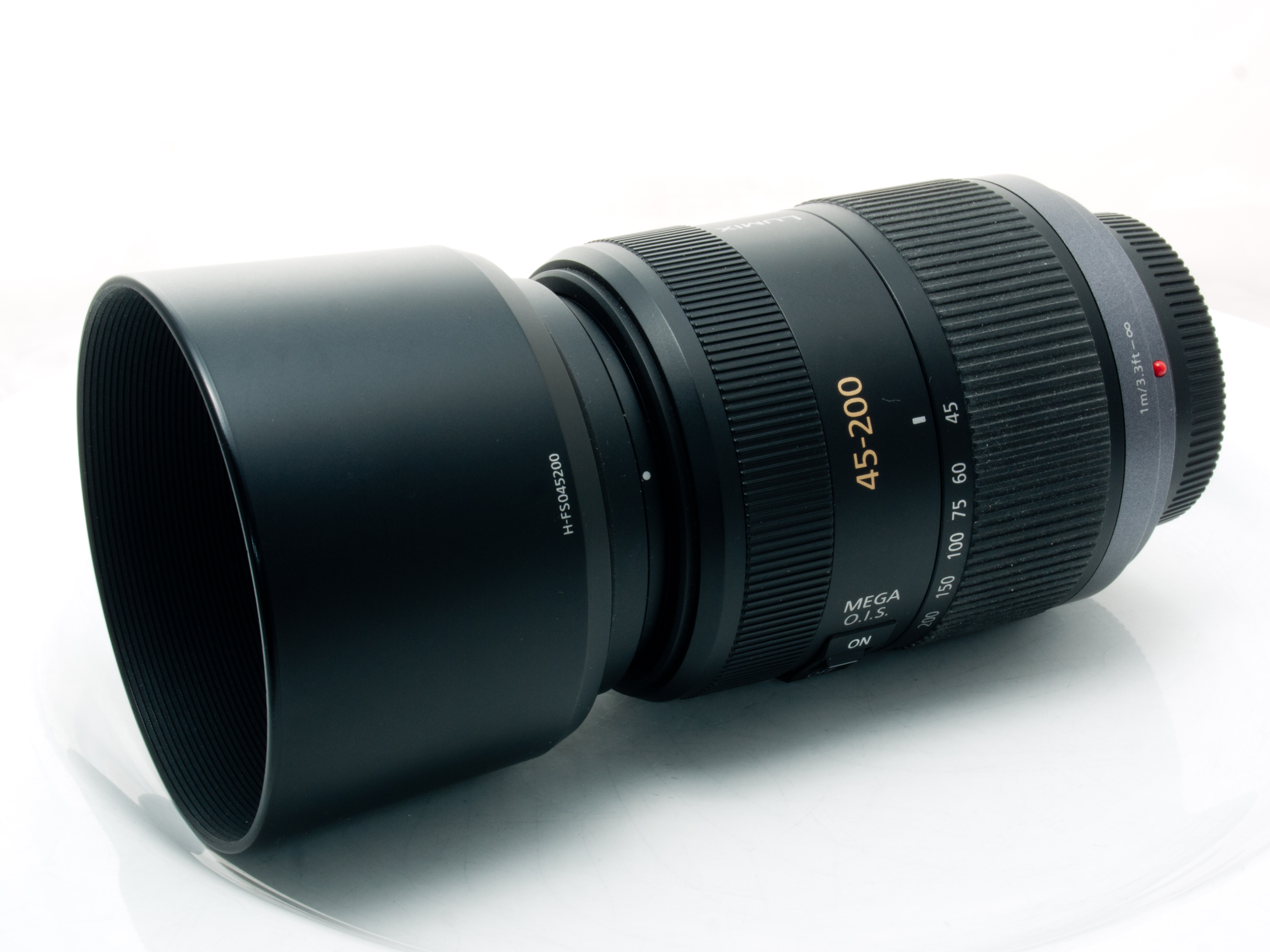
- Maker: Panasonic
- Lens mount(s): Micro Four Thirds
- Part number: H-FS045200

Technical data
- Type: Zoom
- Focal length: 45-200mm
- Focal length (35mm equiv.): 90-400mm
- Aperture (max/min): f/4.0-5.6 - f/
- Close focus distance: 1.0 m (39.4 in)
- Max. magnification: 0.19
- Construction: 16 elements in 13 groups

Features
- Lens-based stabilization: Yes Yes
- Macro capable: No No

Physical
- Max. length: 100 mm (3.94 in)
- Diameter: 70 mm (2.76 in)
- Weight: 380g (12.4 oz)
- Filter diameter: 52mm
- Color: Black

Accessories
- Lens hood: included
- Case: included

History
- Introduction: 2008

The Panasonic Lumix G Vario 45-200mm f/4.0-f/5.6 MEGA O.I.S lens is a compact telephoto zoom lens for Micro Four Thirds system cameras. It is a varifocal lens.

It was released in 2008, as one of the first Micro Four Thirds lenses, along with the Lumix G 14-45mm lens and the Lumix G1 camera.

A mark II version of the lens was released in 2017. This has the improved POWER O.I.S. image stabilization, as well as Dual I.S. which can combine with in-body image stabilization. It also has faster autofocus, and is splash/dust proof.
