= List of standard zoom lenses =

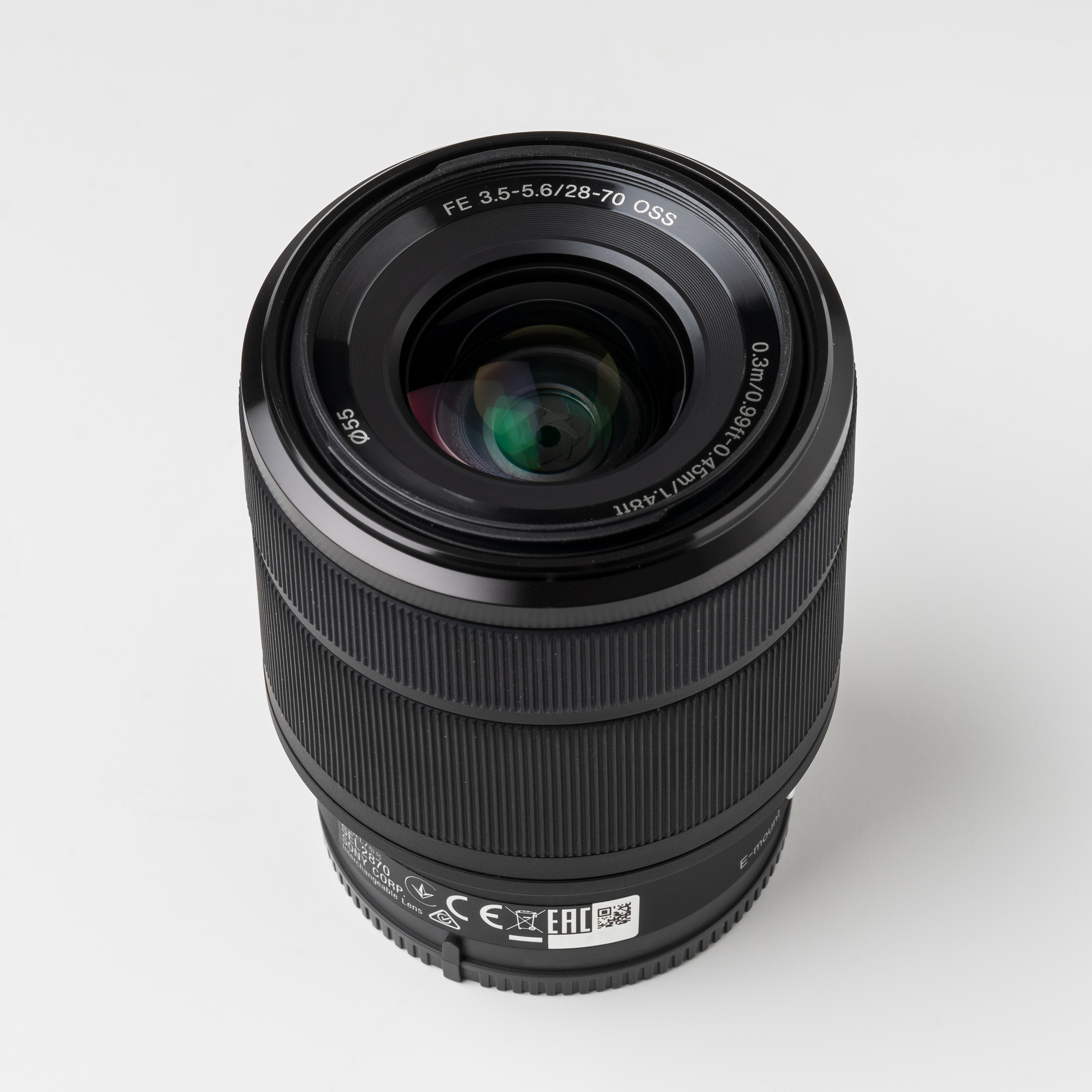
Sony 28-70mm F3.5-5.6, a standard zoom lens

This is a list of standard zoom lenses that are designed for mirrorless cameras — limit one per brand, focal length, aperture, and zoom mechanism combination. There is no precise definition of the term, but lenses marketed as "standard zoom" usually cover a range of at least 30mm to 60mm in terms of 35mm equivalent focal length with an optical zoom ratio of 2.5× (e.g. 28-70mm) to 5× (e.g. 24-120mm) — the most common being 3× (e.g. 24-70mm). They are called standard zoom lenses, because the midpoint of their zoom range is around 50mm, which is considered a standard or "normal" field of view.

== History ==
High-quality optical formulas for wider-angle lenses are more difficult to achieve and expensive to produce, so older standard zoom lenses often started at 27mm or 28mm instead of 24mm at the wide end, especially for smaller sensor formats.

== Medium format lenses ==
Model	Lens mounts	Focal length (Note: 35mm equivalent.)		Aperture		OIS	Weight	Length	Release year	Availability
Model	Lens mounts	Wide	Tele	Wide	Tele	OIS	Weight	Length	Release year	Availability
Hasselblad 35-100mm F2.8-4	XCD	28mm	76mm	f/2.8	f/4.0	No	894g	133mm	2025	Current

== Full-frame lenses ==
Model	Lens mounts	Focal length		Aperture		OIS	Weight	Length	Release year	Availability
Model	Lens mounts	Wide	Tele	Wide	Tele	OIS	Weight	Length	Release year	Availability
Sony 28-70mm F2	E	28mm	70mm	f/2.0	f/2.0	No	918g	140mm	2024	Current
Canon 28-70mm F2	RF	28mm	70mm	f/2.0	f/2.0	No	1430g	140mm	2018	Current
Canon 24-105mm F2.8	RF	24mm	105mm	f/2.8	f/2.8	Yes	1330g	199mm	2023	Current
Nikon 24-70mm F2.8 II	Z	24mm	70mm	f/2.8	f/2.8	No	675g	142mm	2025	Current
Sony 24-70mm F2.8 II	E	24mm	70mm	f/2.8	f/2.8	No	695g	120mm	2022	Current
Sigma 24-70mm F2.8 II	E, L	24mm	70mm	f/2.8	f/2.8	No	735g	120mm	2024	Current
Leica 24-70mm F2.8 (Note: Rebadged version of the Sigma 24-70mm F2.8.)	L	24mm	70mm	f/2.8	f/2.8	No	856g	123mm	2021	Current
Canon 24-70mm F2.8	RF	24mm	70mm	f/2.8	f/2.8	Yes	900g	126mm	2019	Current
Panasonic 24-70mm F2.8	L	24mm	70mm	f/2.8	f/2.8	No	935g	140mm	2021	Current
Samyang 24-70mm F2.8	E	24mm	70mm	f/2.8	f/2.8	No	1027g	129mm	2021	Current
Panasonic 24-60mm F2.8	L	24mm	60mm	f/2.8	f/2.8	No	544g	100mm	2025	Current
Sigma 28-105mm F2.8	E, L	28mm	105mm	f/2.8	f/2.8	No	990g	158mm	2024	Current
Tamron 28-75mm F2.8 G2	E, Z	28mm	75mm	f/2.8	f/2.8	No	540g	118mm	2021	Current
Nikon 28-75mm F2.8	Z	28mm	75mm	f/2.8	f/2.8	No	565g	121mm	2021	Current
Sigma 28-70mm F2.8	E, L	28mm	70mm	f/2.8	f/2.8	No	470g	102mm	2021	Current
Canon 28-70mm F2.8	RF	28mm	70mm	f/2.8	f/2.8	Yes	495g	92mm	2024	Current
Leica 28-70mm F2.8 (Note: Rebadged version of the Sigma 28-70mm F2.8.)	L	28mm	70mm	f/2.8	f/2.8	No	572g	102mm	2025	Current
Leica 24-90mm F2.8-4	L	24mm	90mm	f/2.8	f/4.0	Yes	1140g	138mm	2015	Current
Sony 20-70mm F4	E	20mm	70mm	f/4.0	f/4.0	No	488g	99mm	2023	Current
Nikon 24-120mm F4	Z	24mm	120mm	f/4.0	f/4.0	No	630g	118mm	2021	Current
Sony 24-105mm F4	E	24mm	105mm	f/4.0	f/4.0	Yes	663g	113mm	2017	Current
Panasonic 24-105mm F4	L	24mm	105mm	f/4.0	f/4.0	Yes	680g	118mm	2019	Current
Canon 24-105mm F4	RF	24mm	105mm	f/4.0	f/4.0	Yes	700g	107mm	2018	Current
Sony 24-70mm F4	E	24mm	70mm	f/4.0	f/4.0	Yes	426g	95mm	2013	Current
Nikon 24-70mm F4	Z	24mm	70mm	f/4.0	f/4.0	No	500g	89mm	2018	Current
Panasonic 20-60mm F3.5-5.6	L	20mm	60mm	f/3.5	f/5.6	No	350g	87mm	2020	Current
Sony 28-70mm F3.5-5.6	E	28mm	70mm	f/3.5	f/5.6	Yes	295g	83mm	2013	Current
Canon 24-105mm F4-7.1	RF	24mm	105mm	f/4.0	f/7.1	Yes	395g	89mm	2020	Current

== APS-C lenses ==
The Sigma 17-40mm F1.8 has the largest aperture of all APS-C zoom lenses but narrowly fails to qualify for this list due to its 2.35× zoom ratio. It is included in the list of 2× zoom lenses below.

Model	Lens mounts	Focal length		Aperture		OIS	Weight	Length	Release year	Availability
Model	Lens mounts	Wide	Tele	Wide	Tele	OIS	Weight	Length	Release year	Availability
Samsung 16-50mm F2-2.8	NX	24mm	75mm	f/2.0	f/2.8	Yes	622g	97mm	2014	Discontinued
Fujifilm 16-55mm F2.8 II	X	24mm	83mm	f/2.8	f/2.8	No	410g	95mm	2024	Current
Sony 16-55mm F2.8	E	24mm	83mm	f/2.8	f/2.8	No	494g	100mm	2019	Current
Tamron 17-70mm F2.8	E, X	26mm	105mm	f/2.8	f/2.8	Yes	525g	119mm	2020	Current
Sigma 18-50mm F2.8	E, X, L	27mm	75mm	f/2.8	f/2.8	No	285g	77mm	2021	Current
Sigma 18-50mm F2.8	RF	29mm	80mm	f/2.8	f/2.8	No	300g	75mm	2024	Current
Fujifilm 18-55mm F2.8-4	X	27mm	83mm	f/2.8	f/4.0	Yes	310g	70mm	2012	Current
Fujifilm 16-80mm F4	X	24mm	120mm	f/4.0	f/4.0	Yes	440g	89mm	2019	Current
Sony 16-70mm F4	E	24mm	105mm	f/4.0	f/4.0	Yes	308g	75mm	2013	Current
Fujifilm 16-50mm F2.8-4.8	X	24mm	75mm	f/2.8	f/4.8	No	240g	71mm	2024	Current
Fujifilm 15-45mm F3.5-5.6	X	23mm	68mm	f/3.5	f/5.6	Yes	135g	44mm	2018	Current
Sony 16-50mm F3.5-5.6 II	E	24mm	75mm	f/3.5	f/5.6	Yes	107g	31mm	2024	Current
Samsung 16-50mm F3.5-5.6	NX	24mm	75mm	f/3.5	f/5.6	Yes	111g	31mm	2014	Discontinued
Fujifilm 16-50mm F3.5-5.6 II	X	24mm	75mm	f/3.5	f/5.6	Yes	195g	65mm	2015	Current
Canon 15-45mm F3.5-6.3	EF-M	24mm	72mm	f/3.5	f/5.6	Yes	130g	45mm	2015	Discontinued
Leica 18-56mm F3.5-5.6	L	27mm	84mm	f/3.5	f/5.6	No	256g	60mm	2014	Discontinued
Sony 18-55mm F3.5-5.6	E	27mm	83mm	f/3.5	f/5.6	Yes	194g	60mm	2010	Discontinued
Samsung 18-55mm F3.5-5.6 III	NX	27mm	83mm	f/3.5	f/5.6	Yes	204g	65mm	2013	Discontinued
Canon 18-55mm F3.5-6.3	EF-M	29mm	88mm	f/3.5	f/5.6	Yes	210g	61mm	2012	Discontinued
Samsung 20-50mm F3.5-5.6 II	NX	30mm	75mm	f/3.5	f/5.6	No	119g	40mm	2012	Discontinued
Nikon 16-50mm F3.5-6.3	Z	24mm	75mm	f/3.5	f/6.3	Yes	135g	32mm	2019	Current
Canon 18-45mm F4.5-6.3	RF	29mm	72mm	f/4.5	f/6.3	Yes	130g	44mm	2022	Current

== Micro Four Thirds lenses ==
Model	Focal length		Aperture		OIS	PZ (Note: Power zoom.)	Weight	Length	Release year	Availability
Model	Wide	Tele	Wide	Tele	OIS	PZ	Weight	Length	Release year	Availability
Olympus 12-40mm F2.8 II	24mm	80mm	f/2.8	f/2.8	No	No	382g	84mm	2022	Current
Panasonic Leica 12-35mm F2.8	24mm	70mm	f/2.8	f/2.8	Yes	No	306g	74mm	2022	Current
Panasonic Leica 12-60mm F2.8-4	24mm	120mm	f/2.8	f/4.0	Yes	No	320g	86mm	2017	Current
Yongnuo 12-35mm F2.8-4	24mm	70mm	f/2.8	f/4.0	No	No	318g	94mm	2023	Current
Olympus 12-45mm F4	24mm	90mm	f/4.0	f/4.0	No	No	254g	70mm	2020	Current
Panasonic 12-60mm F3.5-5.6	24mm	120mm	f/3.5	f/5.6	Yes	No	210g	71mm	2016	Current
YI 12-40mm F3.5-5.6	24mm	80mm	f/3.5	f/5.6	No	No	186g	63mm	2016	Discontinued
Panasonic 12-32mm F3.5-5.6	24mm	64mm	f/3.5	f/5.6	Yes	No	70g	24mm	2013	Current
Panasonic 14-45mm F3.5-5.6	28mm	90mm	f/3.5	f/5.6	Yes	No	195g	60mm	2008	Discontinued
Olympus 14-42mm F3.5-5.6 EZ	28mm	84mm	f/3.5	f/5.6	No	Yes	93g	23mm	2014	Current
Panasonic PZ 14-42mm F3.5-5.6	28mm	84mm	f/3.5	f/5.6	Yes	Yes	95g	27mm	2011	Current
Panasonic 14-42mm F3.5-5.6 II	28mm	84mm	f/3.5	f/5.6	Yes	No	110g	49mm	2013	Discontinued
Olympus 14-42mm F3.5-5.6 II R	28mm	84mm	f/3.5	f/5.6	No	No	113g	50mm	2011	Current
Olympus 12-50mm F3.5-6.3 EZ	24mm	100mm	f/3.5	f/6.3	No	Yes	212g	83mm	2011	Discontinued
Kodak 12-45mm F3.5-6.3	24mm	90mm	f/3.5	f/6.3	No	No	183g	63mm	2014	Discontinued

== 1.0-type sensor lenses ==
Model	Lens mounts	Focal length		Aperture		OIS	PZ	Weight	Length	Release year	Availability
Model	Lens mounts	Wide	Tele	Wide	Tele	OIS	PZ	Weight	Length	Release year	Availability
Samsung 9-27mm F3.5-5.6	NX-M	24mm	73mm	f/3.5	f/5.6	Yes	No	73g	30mm	2014	Discontinued
Nikon 10-30mm F3.5-5.6 PD	1	27mm	81mm	f/3.5	f/5.6	Yes	Yes	85g	28mm	2014	Discontinued
Nikon 10-30mm F3.5-5.6	1	27mm	81mm	f/3.5	f/5.6	Yes	No	115g	42mm	2011	Discontinued
Nikon 11–27.5mm F3.5-5.6	1	30mm	74mm	f/3.5	f/5.6	No	No	80g	31mm	2012	Discontinued

== Variants ==
=== 2× ===
This is a list of autofocus lenses designed for mirrorless cameras that at least cover 40mm (a "normal" field of view) in terms of 35mm equivalent focal length with an optical zoom ratio of 2× to 2.4×. In exchange for the smaller zoom ratio, they offer either a larger image circle, larger aperture, or smaller size.

Model	Lens mounts	Focal length		Aperture		OIS	Weight	Length	Release year	Availability
Model	Lens mounts	Wide	Tele	Wide	Tele	OIS	Weight	Length	Release year	Availability
Medium format
Fujifilm 32-64mm F4	G	25mm	51mm	f/4.0	f/4.0	No	875g	116mm	2017	Current
Fujifilm 45-100mm F4	G	36mm	79mm	f/4.0	f/4.0	Yes	1005g	145mm	2020	Current
Hasselblad 35-75mm F3.5-4.5	G	28mm	58mm	f/3.5	f/4.5	No	1115g	145mm	2019	Current
Fujifilm 35-70mm F4.5-5.6	G	28mm	55mm	f/4.5	f/5.6	No	390g	74mm	2021	Current
Full frame
Tamron 20-40mm F2.8	E	20mm	40mm	f/2.8	f/2.8	No	365g	87mm	2021	Current
Sony 24-50mm F2.8	E	24mm	50mm	f/2.8	f/2.8	No	440g	92mm	2024	Current
Sony 28-60mm F4-5.6	E	28mm	60mm	f/4.0	f/5.6	No	167g	45mm	2020	Current
Nikon 24-50mm F4-6.3	Z	24mm	50mm	f/4.0	f/6.3	No	195g	51mm	2020	Current
Panasonic 18-40mm F4.5-6.3	L	18mm	40mm	f/4.5	f/6.3	No	155g	41mm	2024	Current
Canon 24-50mm F4.5-6.3	RF	24mm	50mm	f/4.5	f/6.3	Yes	210g	58mm	2023	Current
APS-C
Sigma 17-40mm F1.8	E, X, L	26mm	60mm	f/1.8	f/1.8	No	525g	118mm	2025	Current
Sigma 17-40mm F1.8	RF	27mm	64mm	f/1.8	f/1.8	No	560g	116mm	2025	Current

=== 20-50mm ===
The increasingly popular 20-50mm zoom range is arguably more versatile than the more established 16-35mm lenses and shares the minimum 2.5× optical zoom ratio of 28-70mm lenses but shifted to a wider field of view. Even some new fixed-lens cameras like the Sony ZV-1 II are switching from a standard zoom lens to a wider zoom lens that covers this range.

Model	Lens mounts	Focal length		Aperture		OIS	Weight	Length	Release year	Availability
Model	Lens mounts	Wide	Tele	Wide	Tele	OIS	Weight	Length	Release year	Availability
Full frame
Tamron 17-50mm F4	E	17mm	50mm	f/4.0	f/4.0	No	460g	114mm	2023	Current
Sony 20-70mm F4	E	20mm	70mm	f/4.0	f/4.0	No	488g	99mm	2023	Current
Panasonic 20-60mm F3.5-5.6	L	20mm	60mm	f/3.5	f/5.6	No	350g	87mm	2020	Current
Micro Four Thirds
Panasonic Leica 10-25mm F1.7	MFT	20mm	50mm	f/1.7	f/1.7	No	690g	128mm	2019	Current
Olympus 8-25mm F4	MFT	16mm	50mm	f/4.0	f/4.0	No	411g	89mm	2021	Current

=== 35-150mm ===
The 35-150mm zoom range shares the 4× optical zoom ratio of 24-105mm lenses but shifted to a tighter field of view, which can be more useful for portraits.

Model	Lens mounts	Focal length		Aperture		OIS	Weight	Length	Release year	Availability
Model	Lens mounts	Wide	Tele	Wide	Tele	OIS	Weight	Length	Release year	Availability
Full frame
Tamron 35-150mm F2-2.8	E, Z	35mm	150mm	f/2.0	f/2.8	No	1165g	158mm	2021	Current
Samyang 35-150mm F2-2.8 (Note: Also sold under the Rokinon brand.)	E, L	35mm	150mm	f/2.0	f/2.8	No	1315g	157mm	2023	Current

== See also ==
- List of superzoom lenses
- List of kit lenses
- List of pancake lenses
- List of large sensor zoom cameras
