= Sony FE 24-105mm F4 G OSS =

- Maker: Sony
- Lens mount(s): Sony E-mount

Technical data
- Type: Zoom
- Focal length: 24-105mm
- Image format: 35mm full-frame
- Aperture (max/min): f/4.0-22.0
- Close focus distance: 0.38 metres (1.2 ft)
- Max. magnification: 1:3 (0.32x)
- Diaphragm blades: 9
- Construction: 17 elements in 14 groups

Features
- Manual focus override: Yes Yes
- Weather-sealing: Yes Yes
- Lens-based stabilization: Yes Yes
- Aperture ring: No No
- Unique features: G-series lens
- Application: Multipurpose

Physical
- Max. length: 113.3 millimetres (4.46 in)
- Diameter: 83.4 millimetres (3.28 in)
- Weight: 663 grams (1.462 lb)
- Filter diameter: 77mm

History
- Introduction: 2017

Retail info
- MSRP: $1299 USD

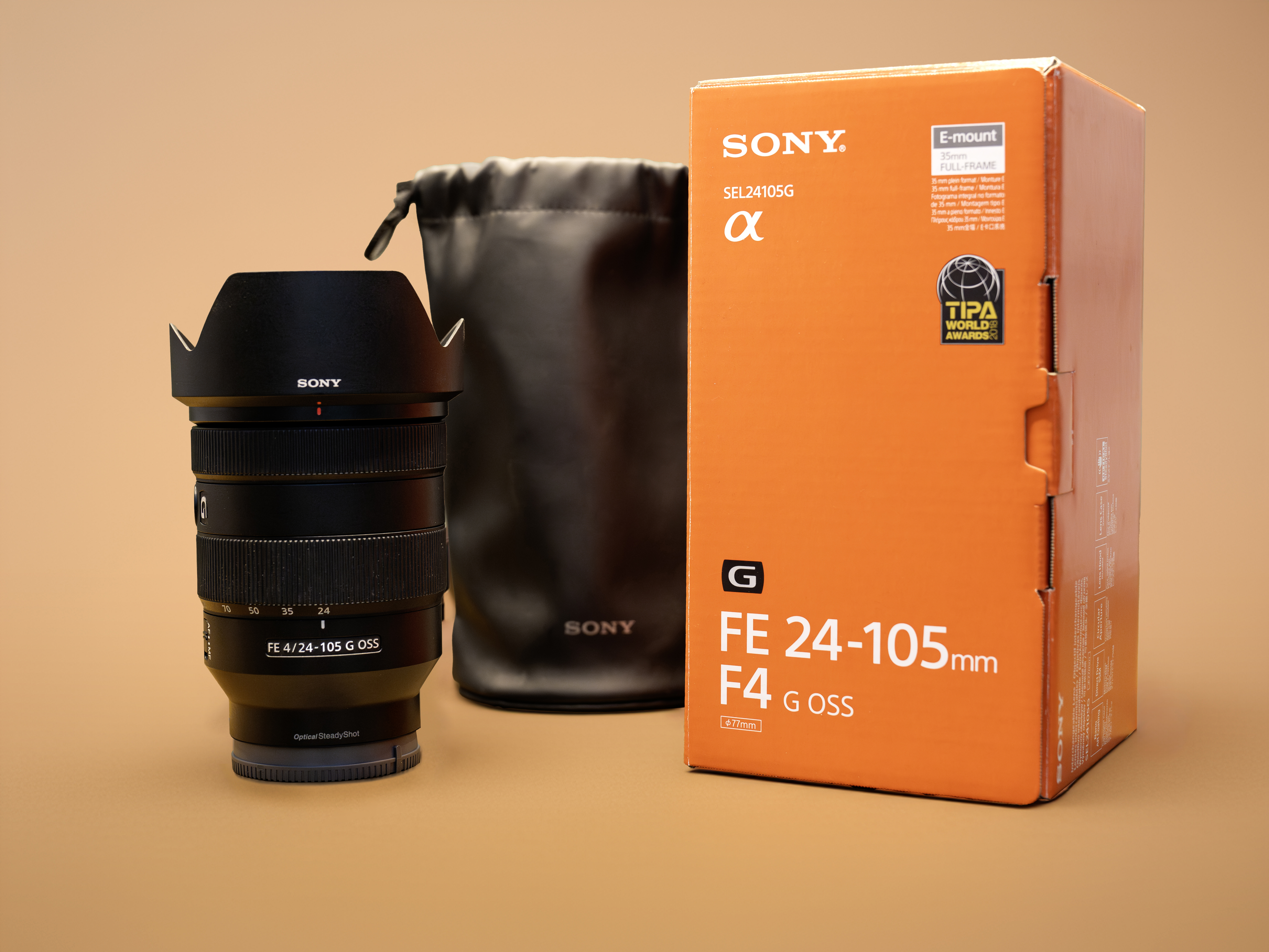
Sony FE 24-105mm F4 G OSS with lens pouch and packaging

A complete rotation of the lens

The Sony FE 24-105mm F4 G OSS is a constant maximum aperture full-frame (FE) zoom lens for the Sony E-mount, announced by Sony on October 25, 2017.

Given its unusually high 1:3 (0.32x) image reproduction ratio, the 24-105mm lens can be considered a pseudo-macro lens. Though designed for Sony's full frame E-mount cameras, the lens can be used on Sony's APS-C E-mount camera bodies, with an equivalent full-frame field-of-view of 36–157.5mm.

== Build quality ==
The lens showcases a matte-black weather resistant plastic exterior with a rubber focus and zoom ring. There is also a programmable external focus-hold button and an Autofocus-Manual focus switch. The barrel of the lens telescopes outward from the main lens body as it's zoomed in from 24mm to 105mm.

== See also ==
- List of Sony E-mount lenses
- List of standard zoom lenses
