= Olympus M.Zuiko Digital 14-42mm f/3.5-5.6 IIR =

Micro Four Thirds camera released by Olympus

M.Zuiko Digital 14-42mm f3.5-5.6 II R
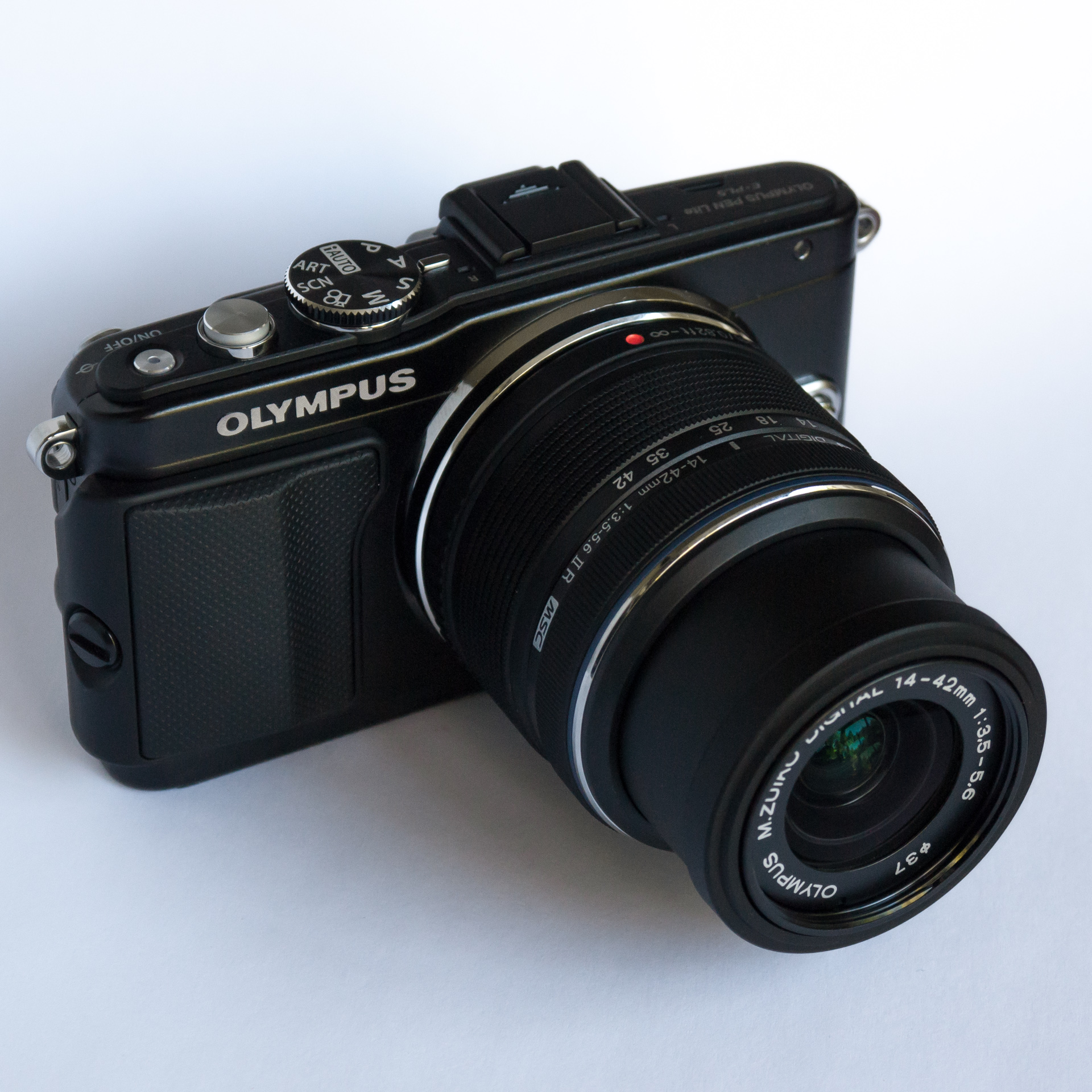
- Maker: Olympus Corporation

Technical data
- Type: Standard Zoom
- Focal length: 14-42mm
- Focal length (35mm equiv.): 28-84mm
- Aperture (max/min): f/3.5-5.6
- Close focus distance: 0.25m (9.84 in)
- Max. magnification: 0.19
- Construction: 8 elements in 7 groups

Features
- Lens-based stabilization: No No
- Macro capable: No No

Physical
- Max. length: 50 mm (1.97 in)
- Diameter: 56.5 mm (2.22 in)
- Weight: 113g (3.99 oz)
- Filter diameter: Ø37 mm

Angle of view
- Diagonal: 75-29°

History
- Introduction: 2011

The M.Zuiko Digital 14–42 mm f/3.5-5.6 II R is a Micro Four Thirds System lens by Olympus Corporation. It is sold as a standalone item, and also as part of a kit along with bodies for all cameras in the Olympus PEN series.

== See also ==
- List of standard zoom lenses
