= Panasonic Lumix G X Vario PZ 14-42mm =

Lumix 14–42mm
- Maker: Panasonic

Technical data
- Type: Zoom
- Focal length: 14-42mm
- Focal length (35mm equiv.): 28-84mm
- Aperture (max/min): f/3.5-5.6
- Close focus distance: 0.2 m (8 in)
- Max. magnification: 0.34
- Diaphragm blades: 7, rounded
- Construction: 9 elements in 8 groups

Features
- Lens-based stabilization: Yes Yes
- Macro capable: No No

Physical
- Max. length: 84 mm (3.31 in)
- Diameter: 61 mm (2.4 in)
- Weight: 95g (3.4 oz)
- Filter diameter: 37 mm

Accessories
- Lens hood: n

Angle of view
- Diagonal: 29-75 deg

History
- Introduction: 2011

The Panasonic Lumix G X Vario PZ 14-42mm is a zoom lens in the Micro Four Thirds system. It is a "standard zoom"- ranging from moderately wide to moderately tele. An unusual feature is that the lens collapses to pancake size. To do so, focus-by-wire and power zoom are manually controlled by two thumb levers, not grip rings. There is no hardware switch for O.I.S, instead being controlled via the camera body. Panasonic's "HD" branding indicates focus and zoom motors are quiet, for videography. The optics contain Panasonic's "nano surface coating".

== See also ==
- List of standard zoom lenses
