= Panasonic Lumix G X Vario 12-35mm =

Lumix 12–35mm
- Maker: Panasonic

Technical data
- Type: Zoom
- Focal length: 12-35mm
- Focal length (35mm equiv.): 24-70mm
- Aperture (max/min): f/2.8
- Close focus distance: 0.25 m (10 in)
- Max. magnification: 0.17
- Diaphragm blades: 7, rounded
- Construction: 14 elements in 9 groups

Features
- Lens-based stabilization: Yes Yes
- Macro capable: No No

Physical
- Max. length: 73.8 mm (2.9 in)
- Diameter: 67.6 mm (2.7 in)
- Weight: 305g (10.8 oz)
- Filter diameter: Ø58 mm

Accessories
- Lens hood: y

Angle of view
- Diagonal: 34-84 deg

History
- Introduction: 2012

The Panasonic Lumix G X Vario 12-35mm F2.8 is a zoom lens in the Micro Four Thirds system. It is a "standard zoom"- ranging from moderately wide to moderately tele. Panasonic's "HD" branding indicates focus and zoom motors are quiet, for videography. The optics contain Panasonic's "nano surface coating". The lens also features Panasonic's optical image stabilization system called Power OIS.

A second version called the Panasonic Lumix G X Vario 12-35mm F2.8 II was released in 2017, and a third version called the Panasonic Leica DG Vario-Elmarit 12-35mm F2.8 was released in 2022. Both versions appear to contain the same optical elements and are the same size and nearly the same weight as the original.

== See also ==
- List of standard zoom lenses
