= Olympus M.Zuiko Digital ED 14-42mm f/3.5-5.6 EZ =

Olympus M.Zuiko Digital ED 14-42mm F3.5-5.6 EZ
- Maker: Olympus
- Lens mount(s): Micro Four Thirds

Technical data
- Type: Zoom
- Focus drive: Stepper motor
- Focal length: 14-42mm
- Aperture (max/min): f/3.5 - f/5.6
- Close focus distance: 0.25 metres (0.82 ft)
- Max. magnification: 0.23
- Diaphragm blades: 5
- Construction: 8 elements in 7 groups

Features
- Manual focus override: No No
- Weather-sealing: No No
- Lens-based stabilization: No No
- Aperture ring: No No
- Unique features: Pancake lens

Physical
- Diameter: 61 millimetres (2.4 in)
- Weight: 91 grams (0.201 lb)
- Filter diameter: 37mm

Accessories
- Lens hood: Third-party only

History
- Introduction: 2014

The Olympus M.Zuiko Digital ED 14-42mm F3.5-5.6 EZ is a pancake standard zoom lens for Micro Four Thirds. It was announced by Olympus Corporation on January 29, 2014.

== See also ==
- List of standard zoom lenses
