= Panasonic Lumix 14-45mm lens =

Lumix 14-45mm
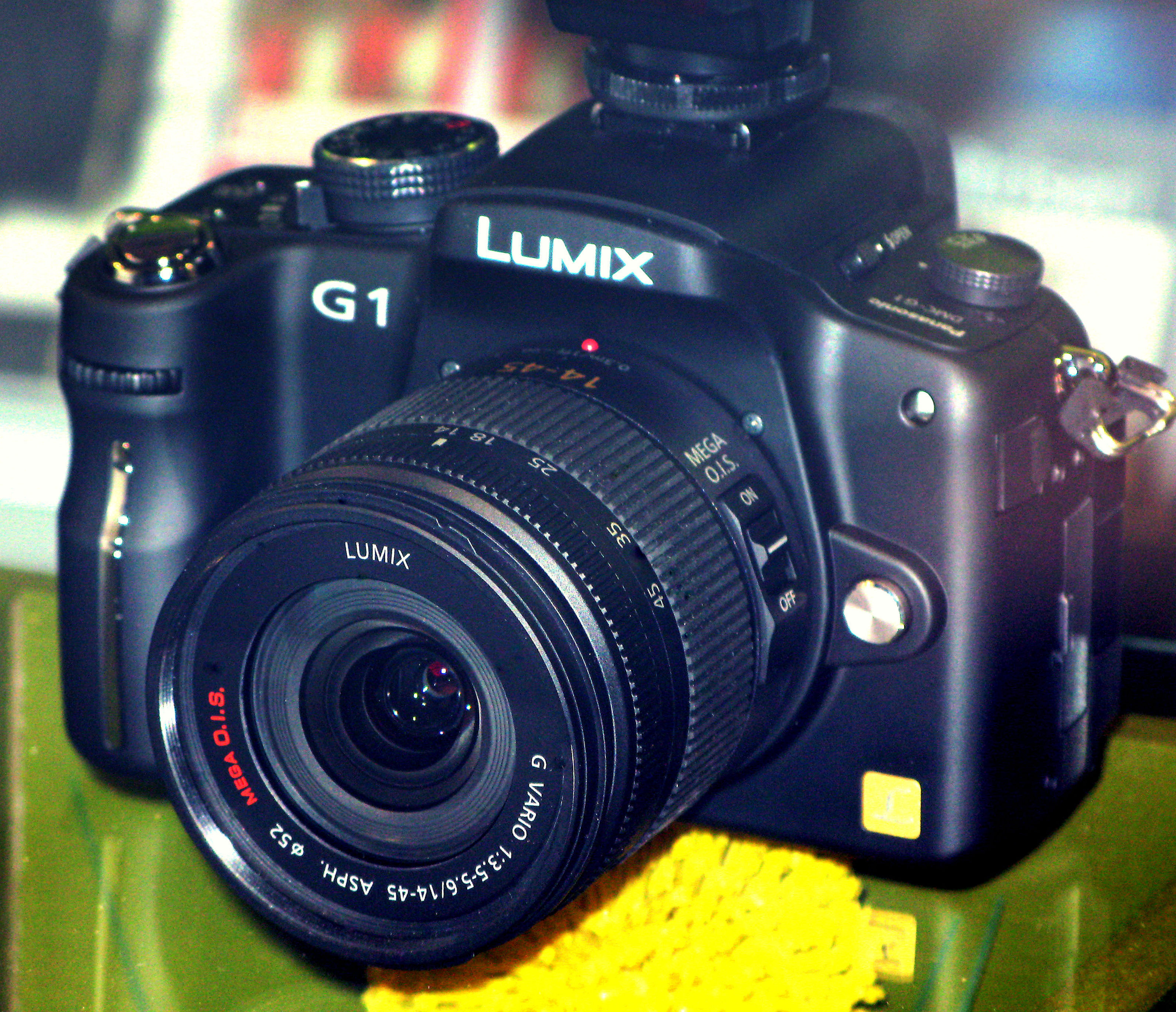
- 14-45mm lens, on a Lumix G1
- Maker: Panasonic

Technical data
- Focal length: 14-45mm
- Focal length (35mm equiv.): 28-90mm
- Aperture (max/min): f/3.5-5.6
- Close focus distance: 0.3 m (1 ft)
- Max. magnification: 0.17
- Diaphragm blades: 7
- Construction: 12 elements in 9 groups

Features
- Lens-based stabilization: Yes Yes
- Macro capable: No No

Physical
- Max. length: 60 mm (2.36 in)
- Diameter: 60 mm (2.36 in)
- Weight: 195g (6.88 oz)
- Filter diameter: 52mm

Accessories
- Lens hood: Included

History
- Introduction: 2008

The Panasonic Lumix G Vario 14-45mm f/3.5-5.6 lens is a standard zoom lens for Micro Four Thirds system cameras. It was the kit zoom included with Panasonic's Micro Four Thirds bodies, until replaced in early 2010 by the Panasonic Lumix G Vario 14-42mm. The 14-45mm is still available as a separate purchase.

Unlike the 14-42mm, the 14-45mm has a metal mount and hardware OIS switch. The front elements extend upon zooming, but do not rotate, allowing consistent use of polarized filters. The 52mm filter diameter lets a user share common filters with the Panasonic 14-42mm and 45-200mm, but not the 14-140 or 100-300mm.

The lens received good reviews compared to typical kit zooms offered by manufacturers, and particularly compared to the cheaper Panasonic 14-42mm.

== See also ==
- List of standard zoom lenses
