= Canon RF lens mount =

Mirrorless camera lens mount

Canon RF mount
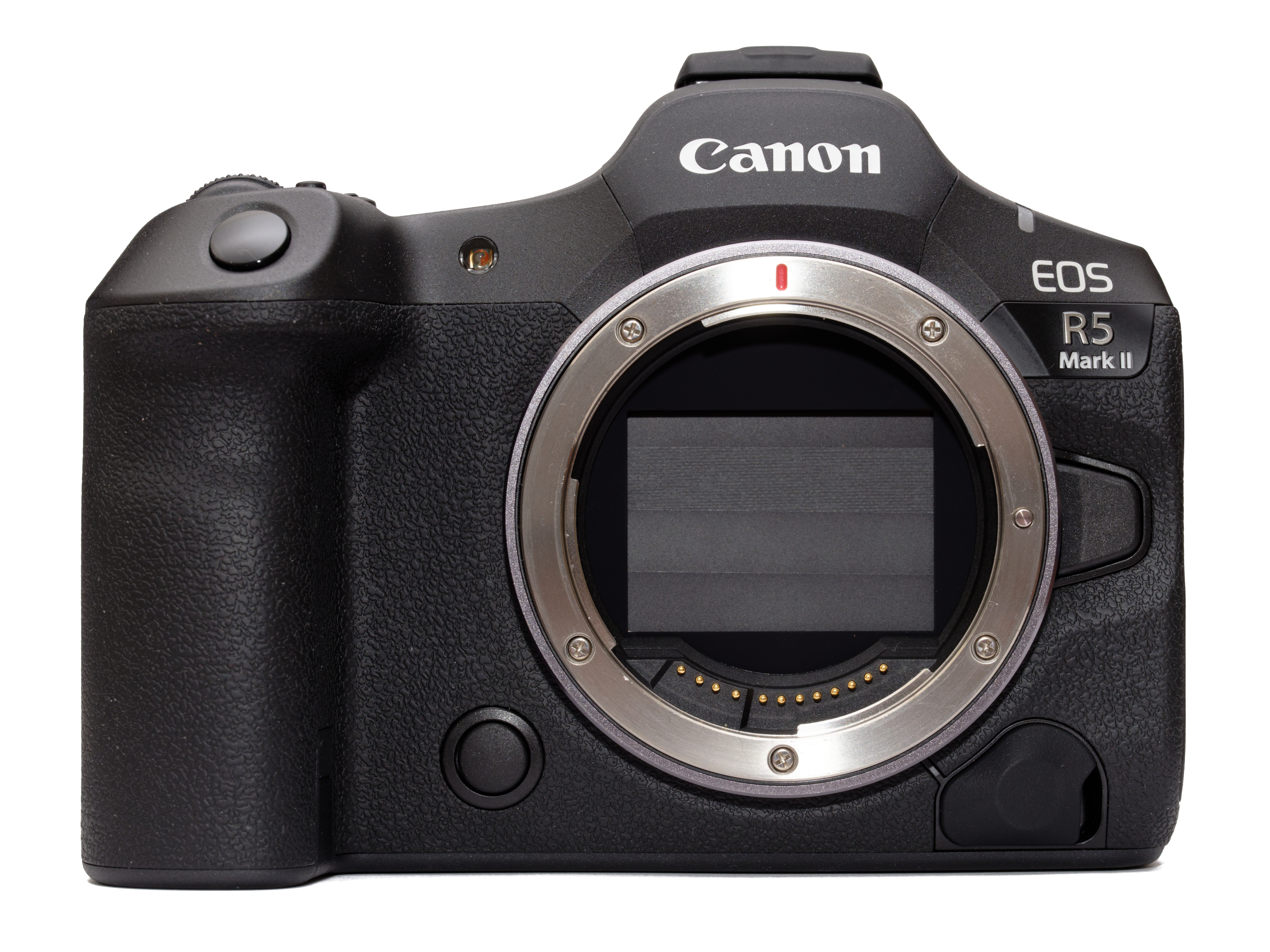
- Canon EOS R5 Mark II with Canon RF mount visible
- Type: Bayonet
- External diameter: 69 mm
- Inner diameter: 54 mm
- Tabs: 3
- Flange: 20 mm
- Connectors: 12 electrical pins
- Introduced: September 2018; 8 years ago
- Replaced: Canon EF mount; Canon EF-S mount; Canon EF-M mount

The Canon RF lens mount is an interchangeable-lens mount developed by Canon for its full-frame mirrorless interchangeable-lens cameras, and featured first by the EOS R, followed by the EOS RP. The RF mount was announced in September 2018. In May 2022, Canon announced APS-C EOS R cameras (the EOS R10 and EOS R7) and RF-S lenses designed for these cameras.

The RF mount allows for the use of Canon EF and EF-S mount lenses using one of three Canon-made lens adapters. When an RF-S or EF-S lens is attached, however, the camera will only function as an APS-C camera, not a full-frame camera.

The "RF" retroactively stands for "Re-Imagined Focus".

== Details ==
Canon full-frame cameras have used the EF lens mount since 1987. The RF mount's inner diameter is the same at 54 mm, while its flange focal distance, at 20 mm, is shorter than that of the Canon EF and EF-S mounts at 44 mm and longer than the EF-M mount at 18 mm.

An EF-EOS R lens adapter enables Canon EF, EF-S, TS-E and MP-E lenses to be used on cameras that have the RF mount. The three adapters have differing features:

- Mount Adapter EF-EOS R
- Control Ring Mount Adapter EF-EOS R – the Mount Adapter EF-EOS R with a lens control ring
- Drop-In Filter Mount Adapter EF-EOS R – the Mount Adapter EF-EOS R with the ability to use drop-in filters, either a variable neutral density (V-ND) filter or circular polarising (C-PL) filter, and a clear (CL) filter, released in 2019.

If an EF-EOS R Mount Adapter is used to mount an EF-S lens, the image will have to be cropped by 1.6x due to the smaller image circle on EF-S lenses.

== Cameras ==
All Canon EOS R-series cameras utilize the RF lens mount, starting with the EOS R. In addition, the following digital movie cameras in the Cinema EOS series utilize the RF mount:

- Canon EOS C50
- Canon EOS C70
- Canon EOS C80
- Canon EOS C400

In 2022, Canon licensed the RF lens mount to Red Digital Cinema, allowing the company to use the lens mount on the following cinema cameras:

- RED Komodo 6K
- RED Komodo-X
- RED V-Raptor [X]
- RED V-Raptor XL [X]

== Lenses ==
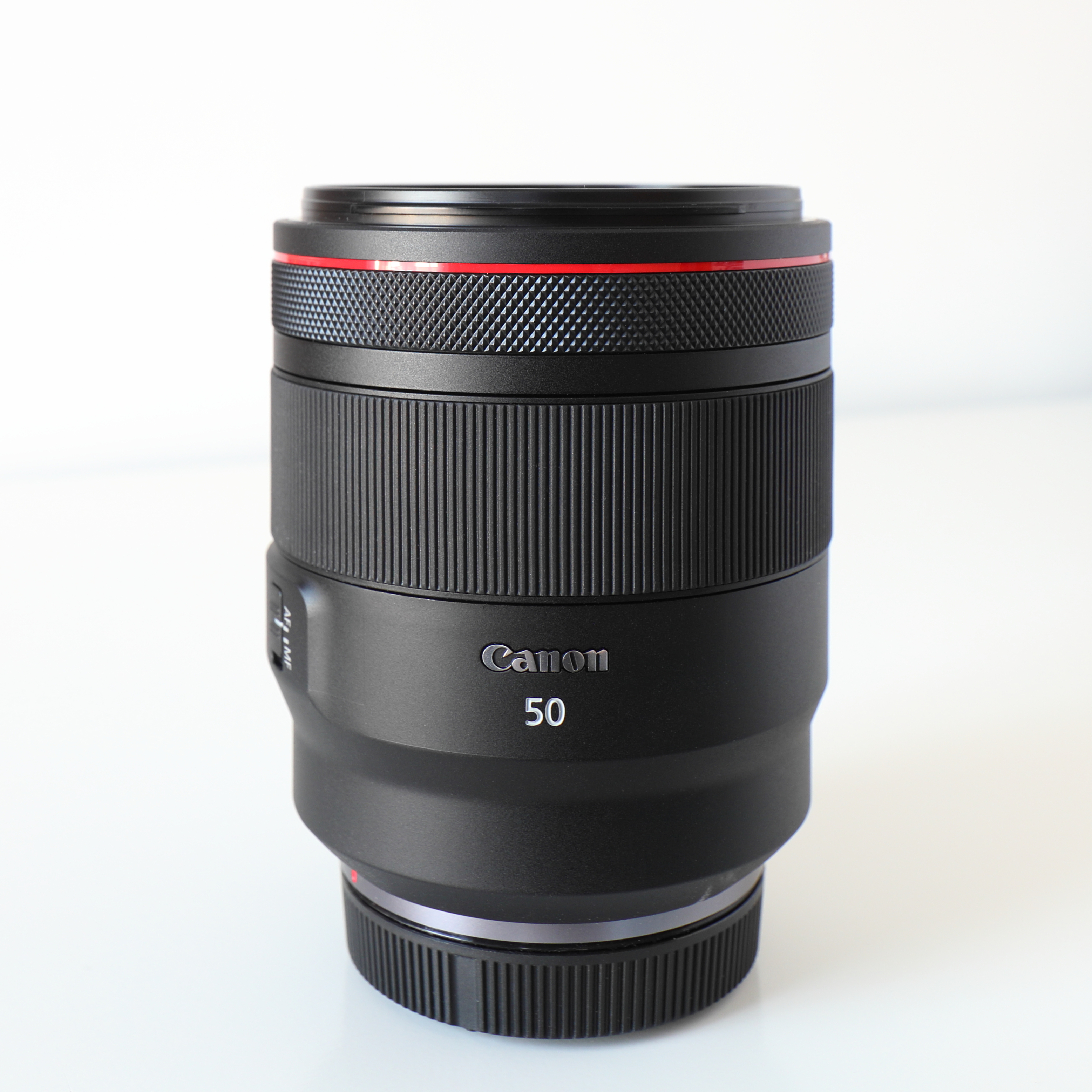
RF 50mm F1.2 L USM without lens hood

When Canon announced its first R-series body, it announced four new RF-mount lenses:

- RF 24–105mm f/4 L IS USM
- RF 28–70mm f/2 L USM
- RF 35mm f/1.8 MACRO IS STM — 0.5× maximum magnification.
- RF 50mm f/1.2 L USM

In conjunction with the February 2019 announcement of the entry-level full-frame EOS RP, Canon announced six additional lenses would be released by the end of that year, although it did not indicate release dates for any of them:

- RF 85mm f/1.2 L USM
- RF 85mm f/1.2 L USM DS — Same as the above, except includes "defocus smoothing" technology intended to improve bokeh. According to Canon, the effect is similar to that of an apodization filter, but achieved through special lens coatings instead of a filter.
- RF 24–240mm f/4–6.3 IS USM
- RF 15–35mm f/2.8 L IS USM
- RF 24–70mm f/2.8 L IS USM
- RF 70–200mm f/2.8 L IS USM

In 2022, Canon introduced the first RF-S lenses (the RF-S 18-150mm and the RF-S 18-45mm) for APS-C sensors, together with the R7 and R10 camera bodies with the first built in APS-C sensors in the R-System. Unlike EF-S mount lenses, RF-S lenses can be mounted on full-frame camera bodies; the camera body will automatically crop the image to fit the smaller image circle of the mounted lens.

RF-mount lenses are not compatible with EF, EF-S or EF-M mount camera bodies.

=== First-party lenses ===
Canon RF-mount lenses
Focal length (mm)	Aperture range	Design.	IS	L	AF Actuator	Filter size	Lens diameter	Lens length	Weight	Type	Hood	Introduced	Ref.
3.9	f/3.5	RF-S; Dual; Fisheye	No	No	RF-S; STM	Rear gelatin	112 mm (4.4 in)× 55 mm (2.2 in)	53.5 mm (2.11 in)	290 g (10 oz)	Prime	—N/a	2024-06-11	
5.2	f/2.8	L Dual; Fisheye	No	Yes	—N/a	Rear gelatin	121.1 mm (4.77 in)× 83.6 mm (3.29 in)	53.5 mm (2.11 in)	350 g (12 oz)	Prime	—N/a	2021-10-06	
7-14	f/2.8–3.5	L IS STM; Fisheye	Yes	Yes	STM	Drop-in Filter	76.5 mm (3.01 in)	109.4 mm (4.31 in)	476 g (16.8 oz)	Zoom	EW-76	2026-02-04	
7.8	f/4.0	RF-S; Dual; Fisheye	No	No	RF-S; STM	58 mm	69.2 mm (2.72 in)	41.5 mm (1.63 in)	130 g (4.6 oz)	Prime	—N/a	2024-10-30	
10–18	f/4.5–6.3	RF-S; IS STM	Yes	No	STM	49 mm	69.0 mm (2.72 in)	44.9 mm (1.77 in)	150 g (5.3 oz)	Zoom	EW-53B	2023-11-02	
10–20	f/4	L IS STM	Yes	Yes	STM	Rear gelatin	83.7 mm (3.30 in)	112 mm (4.4 in)	570 g (20 oz)	Zoom	built into lens	2023-10-11	
14	f/1.4	L VCM	No	Yes	Nano USM, VCM	Rear gelatin	76.5 mm (3.01 in)	112 mm (4.4 in)	578 g (20.4 oz)	Prime	built into lens	2026-02-04	
14–30	f/3.5–6.3	RF-S IS STM PZ	Yes	No	STM	58 mm	62 mm (2.4 in)	89.6 mm (3.53 in)	181 g (6.4 oz)	Zoom	EW-63C	2025-03-26	
14–35	f/4	L IS USM	Yes	Yes	USM	77 mm	84.1 mm (3.31 in)	99.8 mm (3.93 in)	540 g (19 oz)	Zoom	EW-83P	2021-06-29	
15–30	f/4.5–6.3	IS STM	Yes	No	STM	67 mm	76.6 mm (3.02 in)	88.4 mm (3.48 in)	390 g (14 oz)	Zoom	EW-73E	2022-07-12	
15–35	f/2.8	L IS USM	Yes	Yes	USM	82 mm	88.5 mm (3.48 in)	126.8 mm (4.99 in)	840 g (30 oz)	Zoom	EW-88F	2019-08-28	
16	f/2.8	STM	No	No	STM	43 mm	68.5 mm (2.70 in)	40.6 mm (1.60 in)	165 g (5.8 oz)	Prime	EW-65C	2021-09-14	
16–28	f/2.8	IS STM	Yes	No	STM	67 mm	76.5 mm (3.01 in)	91.0 mm (3.58 in)	445 g (15.7 oz)	Zoom	EW-73E	2025-01-24	
18–45	f/4.5–6.3	RF-S IS STM	Yes	No	STM	49 mm	69.0 mm (2.72 in)	44.3 mm (1.74 in)	130 g (4.6 oz)	Zoom	EW-53	2022-05-25	
18–150	f/3.5–6.3	RF-S IS STM	Yes	No	STM	55 mm	69.0 mm (2.72 in)	84.5 mm (3.33 in)	310 g (11 oz)	Zoom	EW-60F	2022-05-25	
20	f/1.4	L VCM	No	Yes	Nano USM, VCM	67 mm	76.5 mm (3.01 in)	99.3 mm (3.91 in)	519 g (18.3 oz)	Prime	EW-73G	2025-06-26	
20–50	f/4.0	L IS USM PZ	Yes	Yes	USM	67 mm	79.9 mm (3.15 in)	94.4 mm (3.72 in)	420 g (15 oz)	Zoom	EW-73H	2026-05-13	
24	f/1.4	L VCM	No	Yes	Nano USM, VCM	67 mm	76.5 mm (3.01 in)	99.3 mm (3.91 in)	525 g (18.5 oz)	Prime	EW-73G	2024-10-30	
24	f/1.8	Macro IS STM	Yes	No	STM	52 mm	74.4 mm (2.93 in)	63.1 mm (2.48 in)	270 g (9.5 oz)	Prime	EW-65B	2022-07-12	
24–50	f/4.5–6.3	IS STM	Yes	No	STM	58 mm	69.6 mm (2.74 in)	58 mm (2.3 in)	210 g (7.4 oz)	Zoom	EW-63C	2023-02-08	
24–70	f/2.8	L IS USM	Yes	Yes	USM	82 mm	88.5 mm (3.48 in)	125.7 mm (4.95 in)	900 g (32 oz)	Zoom	EW-88E	2019-08-28	
24–105	f/2.8	L IS USM Z	Yes	Yes	USM	82 mm	88.5 mm (3.48 in)	199 mm (7.8 in)	1,330 g (47 oz)	Zoom	EW-88E	2023-11-02	
24–105	f/4	L IS USM	Yes	Yes	USM	77 mm	83.5 mm (3.29 in)	107.3 mm (4.22 in)	700 g (25 oz)	Zoom	EW-83N	2018-09-05	
24–105	f/4–7.1	IS STM	Yes	No	STM	67 mm	76.6 mm (3.02 in)	88.8 mm (3.50 in)	395 g (13.9 oz)	Zoom	EW-73D	2020-02-13	
24–240	f/4–6.3	IS USM	Yes	No	USM	72 mm	80.4 mm (3.17 in)	122.5 mm (4.82 in)	750 g (26 oz)	Zoom	EW-78F	2019-07-09	
28	f/2.8	STM	No	No	STM	55 mm	69.2 mm (2.72 in)	24.7 mm (0.97 in)	120 g (4.2 oz)	Prime	EW-55	2023-05-24	
28–70	f/2	L USM	No	Yes	USM	95 mm	103.8 mm (4.09 in)	139.8 mm (5.50 in)	1,430 g (50 oz)	Zoom	EW-103	2018-09-05	
28–70	f/2.8	IS STM	Yes	No	STM	67 mm	76.5 mm (3.01 in)	92.2 mm (3.63 in)	495 g (17.5 oz)	Zoom	EW-73D	2024-09-12	
35	f/1.4	L VCM	No	Yes	Nano USM, VCM	67 mm	76.5 mm (3.01 in)	99.3 mm (3.91 in)	555 g (19.6 oz)	Prime	EW-73F	2024-06-05	
35	f/1.8	Macro IS STM	Yes	No	STM	52 mm	74.4 mm (2.93 in)	62.8 mm (2.47 in)	305 g (10.8 oz)	Prime	EW-52	2018-09-05	
45	f/1.2	STM	No	No	STM	67 mm	78 mm (3.1 in)	75 mm (3.0 in)	346 g (12.2 oz)	Prime	ES-73B	2025-11-06	
50	f/1.2	L USM	No	Yes	USM	77 mm	89.9 mm (3.54 in)	108 mm (4.3 in)	950 g (34 oz)	Prime	ES-83	2018-09-05	
50	f/1.4	L VCM	No	Yes	Nano USM, VCM	67 mm	76.5 mm (3.01 in)	99.3 mm (3.91 in)	590 g (21 oz)	Prime	ES-73	2024-10-30	
50	f/1.8	STM	No	No	STM	43 mm	69.2 mm (2.72 in)	40.5 mm (1.59 in)	160 g (5.6 oz)	Prime	ES-65B	2020-11-04	
55–210	f/5.0–7.1	RF-S IS STM	Yes	No	STM	55 mm	69 mm (2.7 in)	92.9 mm (3.66 in)	270 g (9.5 oz)	Zoom	ET-60B	2023-02-08	
70–200	f/2.8	L IS USM	Yes	Yes	Dual; USM	77 mm	89.9 mm (3.54 in)	146 mm (5.7 in)	1,070 g (38 oz)	Zoom	ET-83F (WIII)	2019-10-24	
70–200	f/2.8	L IS USM Z	Yes	Yes	Dual; USM	82 mm	89 mm (3.5 in)	199 mm (7.8 in)	1,115 g (39.3 oz)	Zoom	ET-88C (WIII or B)	2024-10-30	
70–200	f/4	L IS USM	Yes	Yes	USM	77 mm	83.5 mm (3.29 in)	119 mm (4.7 in)	695 g (24.5 oz)	Zoom	ET-83G (WIII)	2020-11-04	
75–300	f/4–5.6	DC	No	No	D.C.	58 mm	71.2 mm (2.80 in)	146.1 mm (5.75 in)	507 g (17.9 oz)	Zoom	ET-60	2025-04-29	
85	f/1.2	L USM	No	Yes	USM	82 mm	103.2 mm (4.06 in)	117.3 mm (4.62 in)	1,195 g (42.2 oz)	Prime	ET-89	2019-05-08	
85	f/1.2	L USM DS	No	Yes	USM	82 mm	103.2 mm (4.06 in)	117.3 mm (4.62 in)	1,195 g (42.2 oz)	Prime	ET-89	2019-10-24	
85	f/1.4	L VCM	No	Yes	Nano USM, VCM	67 mm	76.5 mm (3.01 in)	99.3 mm (3.91 in)	636 g (22.4 oz)	Prime	EW-73C	2025-09-09	
85	f/2	Macro IS STM	Yes	No	STM	67 mm	78 mm (3.1 in)	90.5 mm (3.56 in)	500 g (18 oz)	Prime	ET-77	2020-07-09	
100	f/2.8	Macro L IS USM	Yes	Yes	USM	67 mm	82 mm (3.2 in)	148 mm (5.8 in)	730 g (26 oz)	Prime	ET-73C	2021-04-14	
100–300	f/2.8	L IS USM	Yes	Yes	USM	112 mm	128 mm (5.0 in)	323.4 mm (12.73 in)	2,650 g (93 oz)	Zoom	ET-124	2023-04-20	
100–400	f/5.6–8	IS USM	Yes	No	USM	67 mm	79.5 mm (3.13 in)	164.5 mm (6.48 in)	635 g (22.4 oz)	Zoom	ET-74B	2021-09-14	
100–500	f/4.5–7.1	L IS USM	Yes	Yes	USM	77 mm	93.8 mm (3.69 in)	207.6 mm (8.17 in)	1,365 g (48.1 oz)	Zoom	ET-83F (WIII)	2020-07-09	
135	f/1.8	L IS USM	Yes	Yes	USM	82 mm	89.2 mm (3.51 in)	130.3 mm (5.13 in)	935 g (33.0 oz)	Prime	EW-88B	2022-11-02	
200–800	f/6.3–9	IS USM	Yes	No	USM	95 mm	102.3 mm (4.03 in)	314.1 mm (12.37 in)	2,050 g (72 oz)	Zoom	ET-101	2023-11-02	
400	f/2.8	L IS USM	Yes	Yes	USM	52 mm drop-in	163 mm (6.4 in)	367 mm (14.4 in)	2,890 g (102 oz)	Prime	ET-155 (WIII); ET-155B	2021-04-14	
600	f/4	L IS USM	Yes	Yes	USM	52 mm drop-in	168 mm (6.6 in)	472 mm (18.6 in)	3,090 g (109 oz)	Prime	ET-160 (WIII); ET-160B	2021-04-14	
600	f/11	IS STM	Yes	No	STM	82 mm	93 mm (3.7 in)	269.5 mm (10.61 in)	930 g (33 oz)	Prime	ET-88B	2020-07-09	
800	f/5.6	L IS USM	Yes	Yes	USM	52 mm drop-in	163 mm (6.4 in)	432 mm (17.0 in)	3,140 g (111 oz)	Prime	ET-155 (long); ET-155B (short)	2022-02-24	
800	f/11	IS STM	Yes	No	STM	95 mm	101.6 mm (4.00 in)	351.8 mm (13.85 in)	1,260 g (44 oz)	Prime	ET-101	2020-07-09	
1200	f/8	L IS USM	Yes	Yes	USM	52 mm drop-in	168 mm (6.6 in)	537 mm (21.1 in)	3,340 g (118 oz)	Prime	ET-160 (long); ET-160B (short)	2022-02-24	

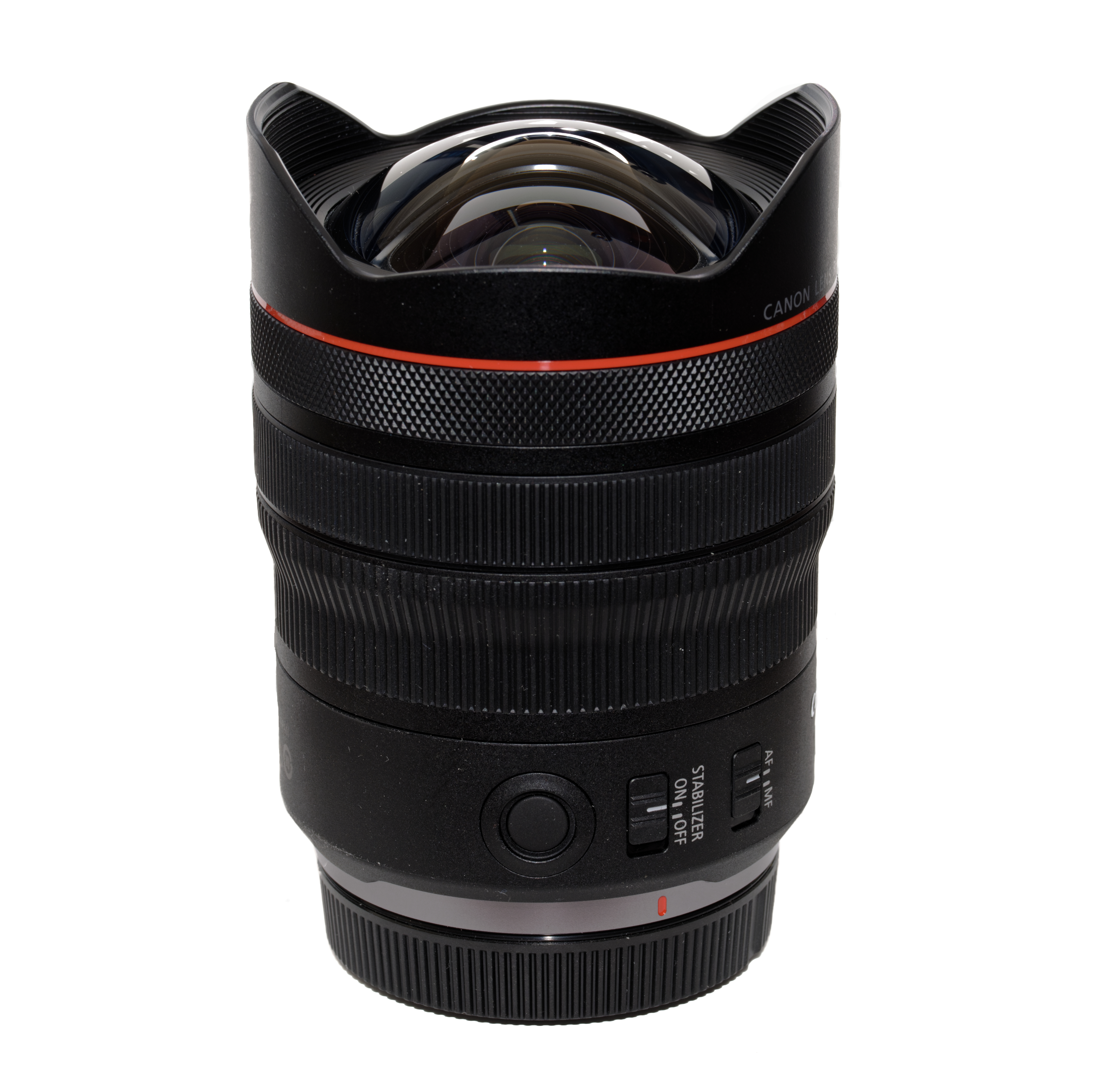
RF 10–20 mm f/4 L IS STM

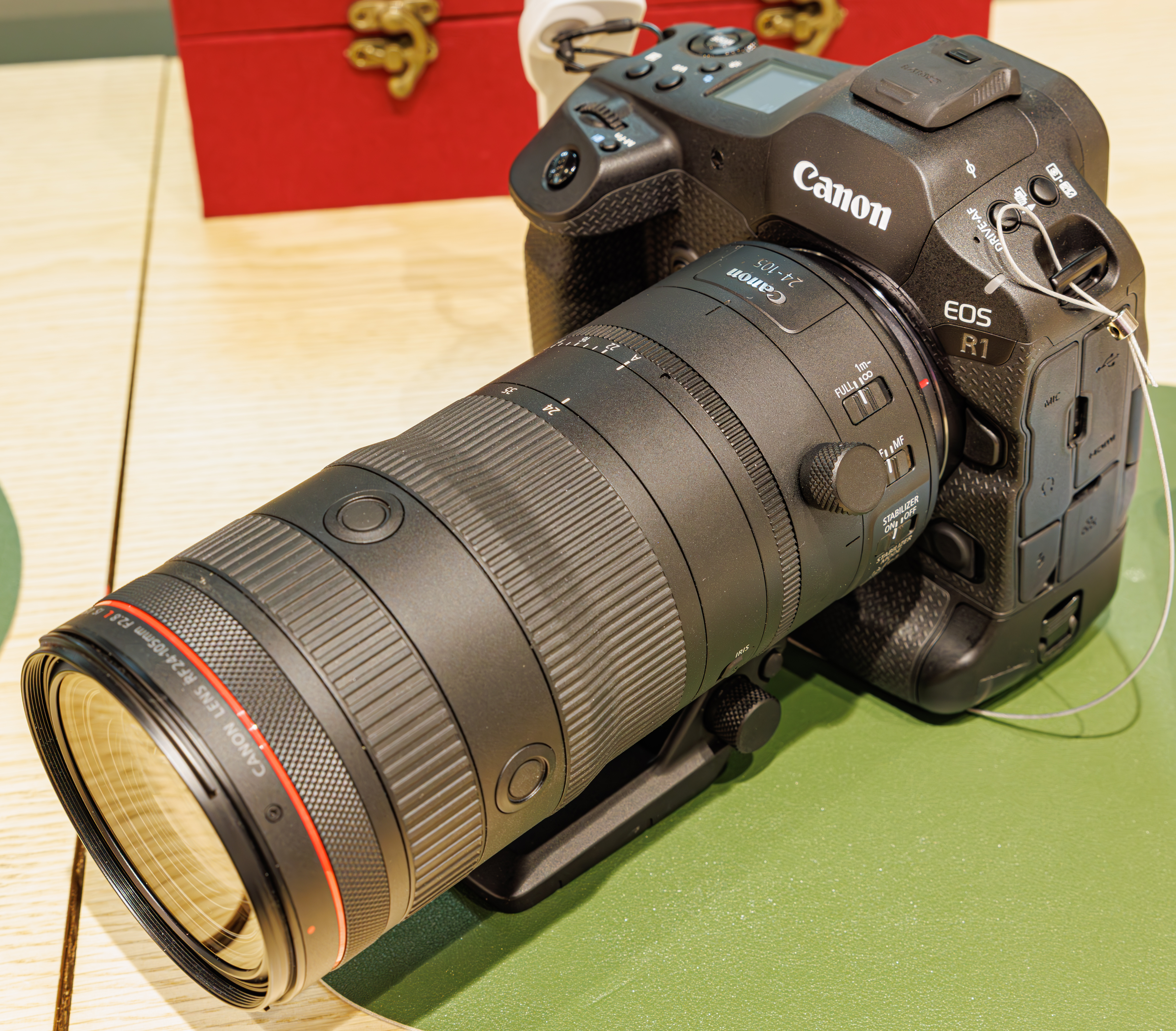
RF 24–105 mm f/2.8 L IS USM Z

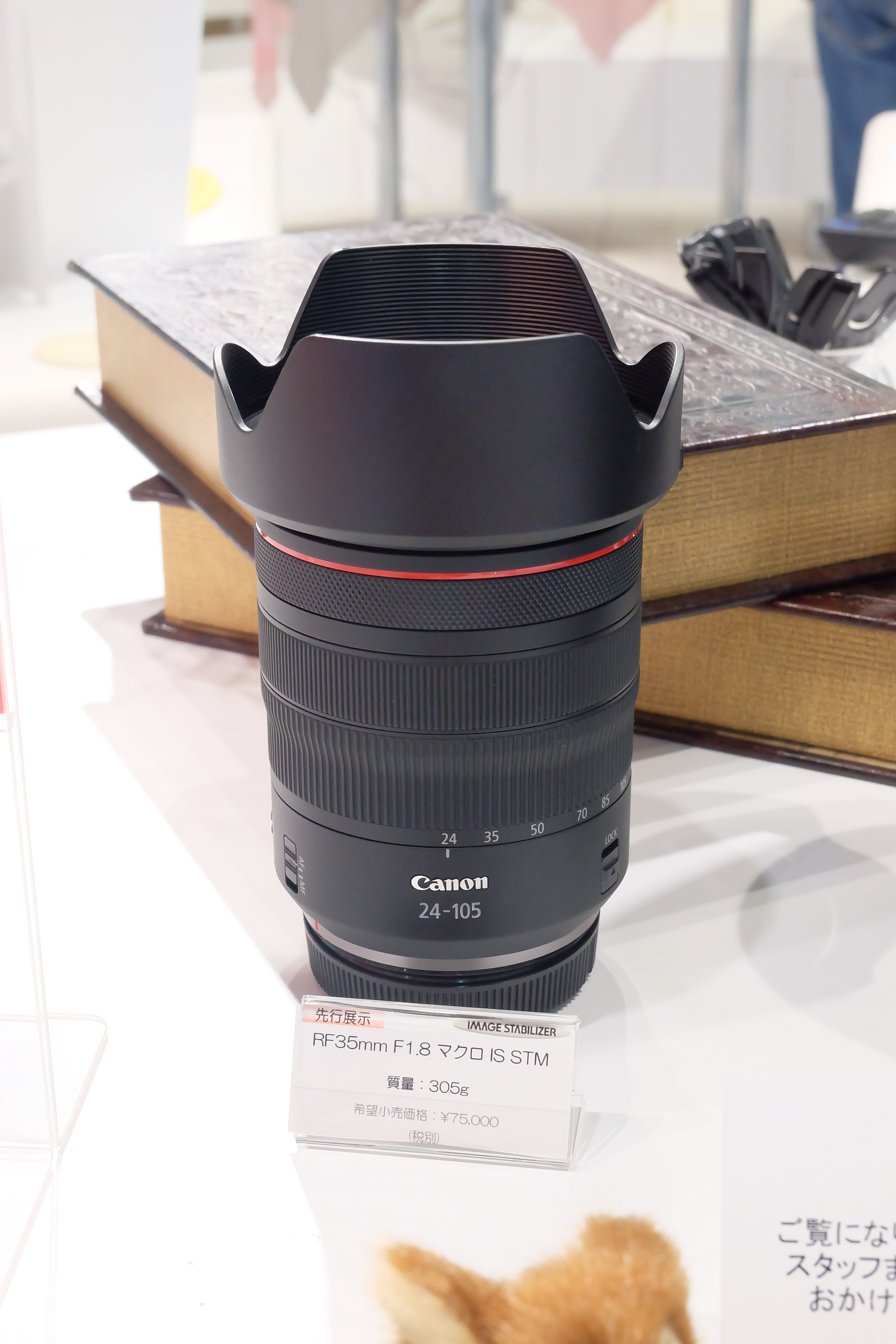
RF 24–105 mm f/4 L IS USM

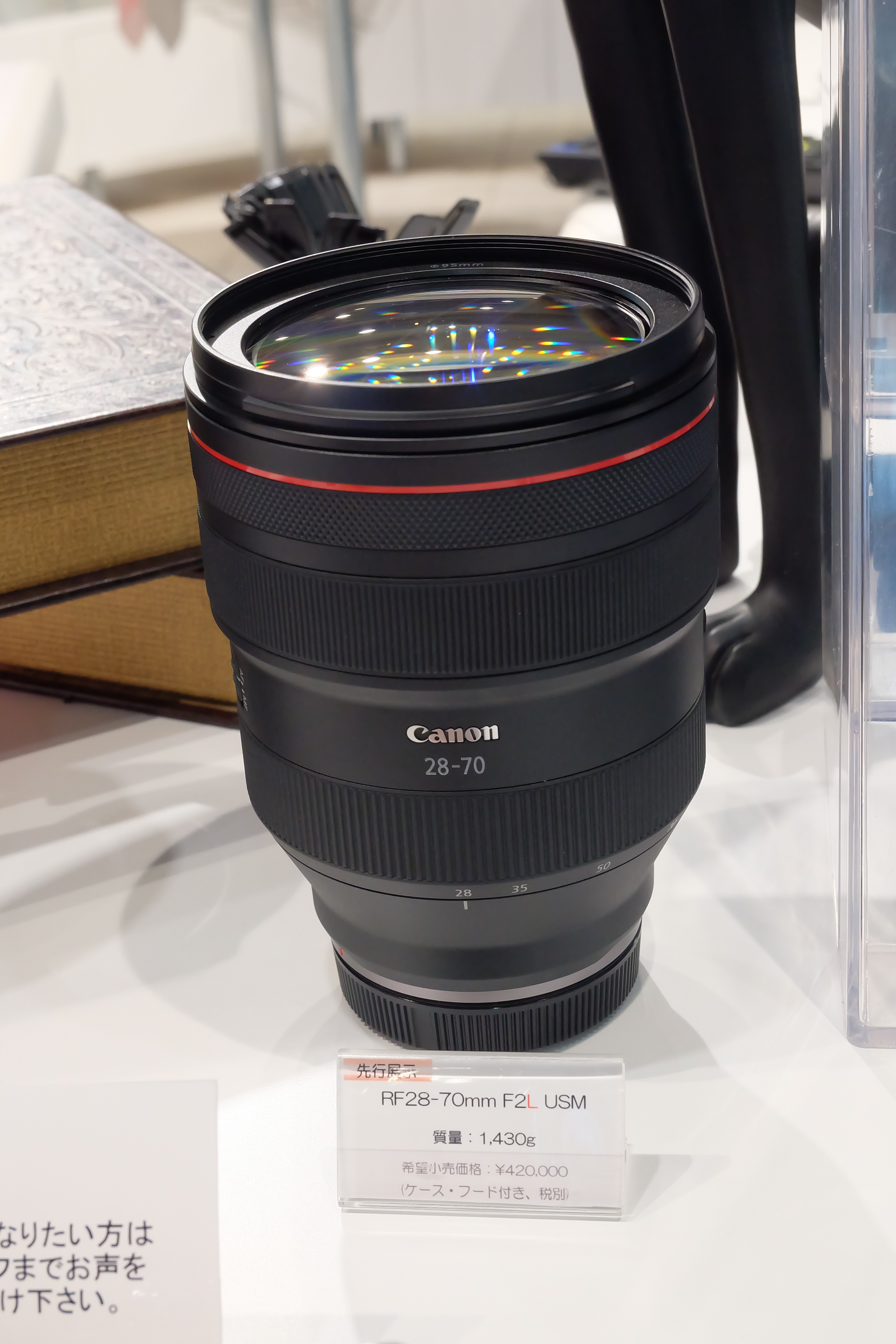
RF 28–70 mm f/2 L USM

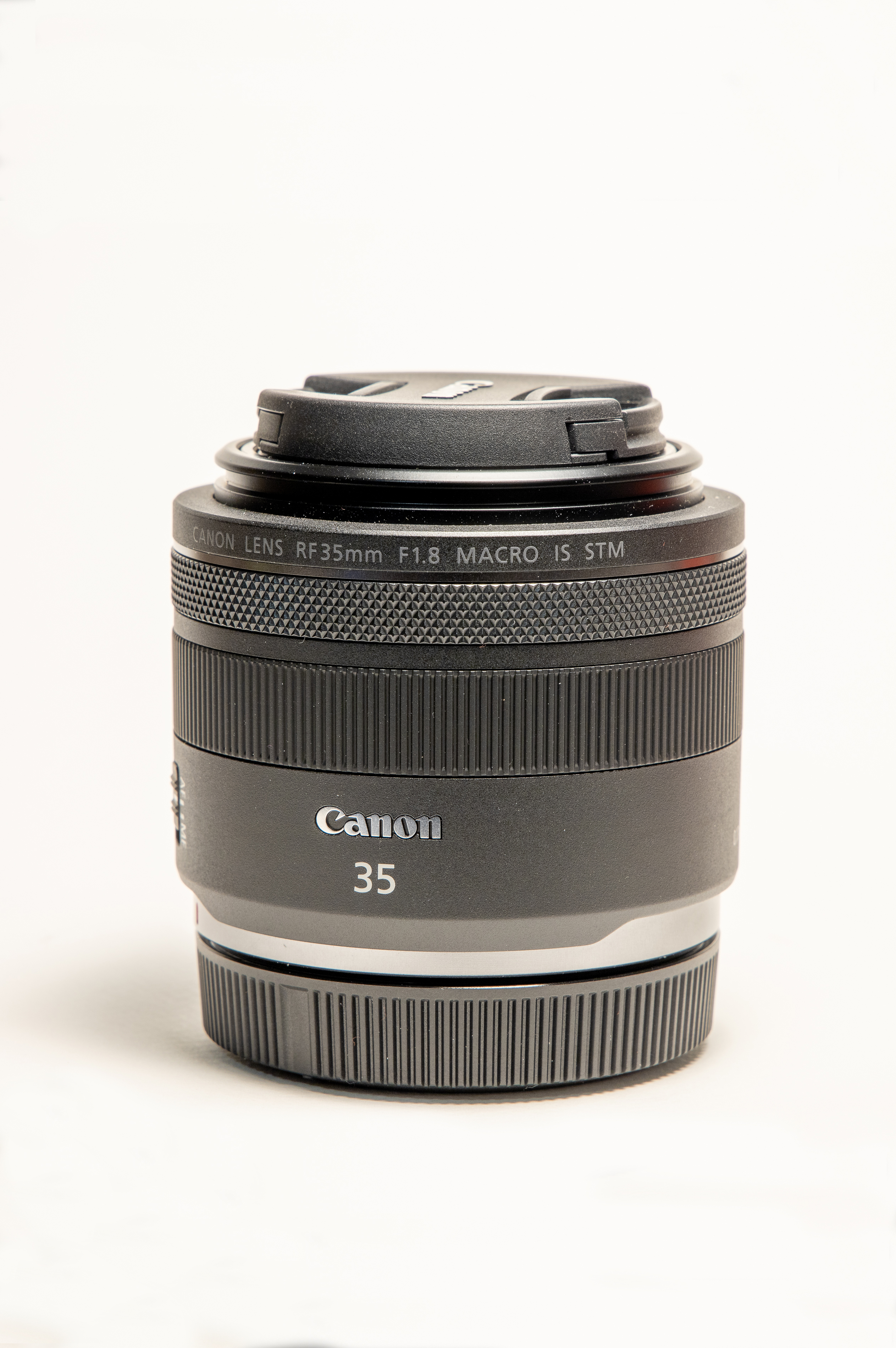
RF 35 mm f/1.8 MACRO IS STM

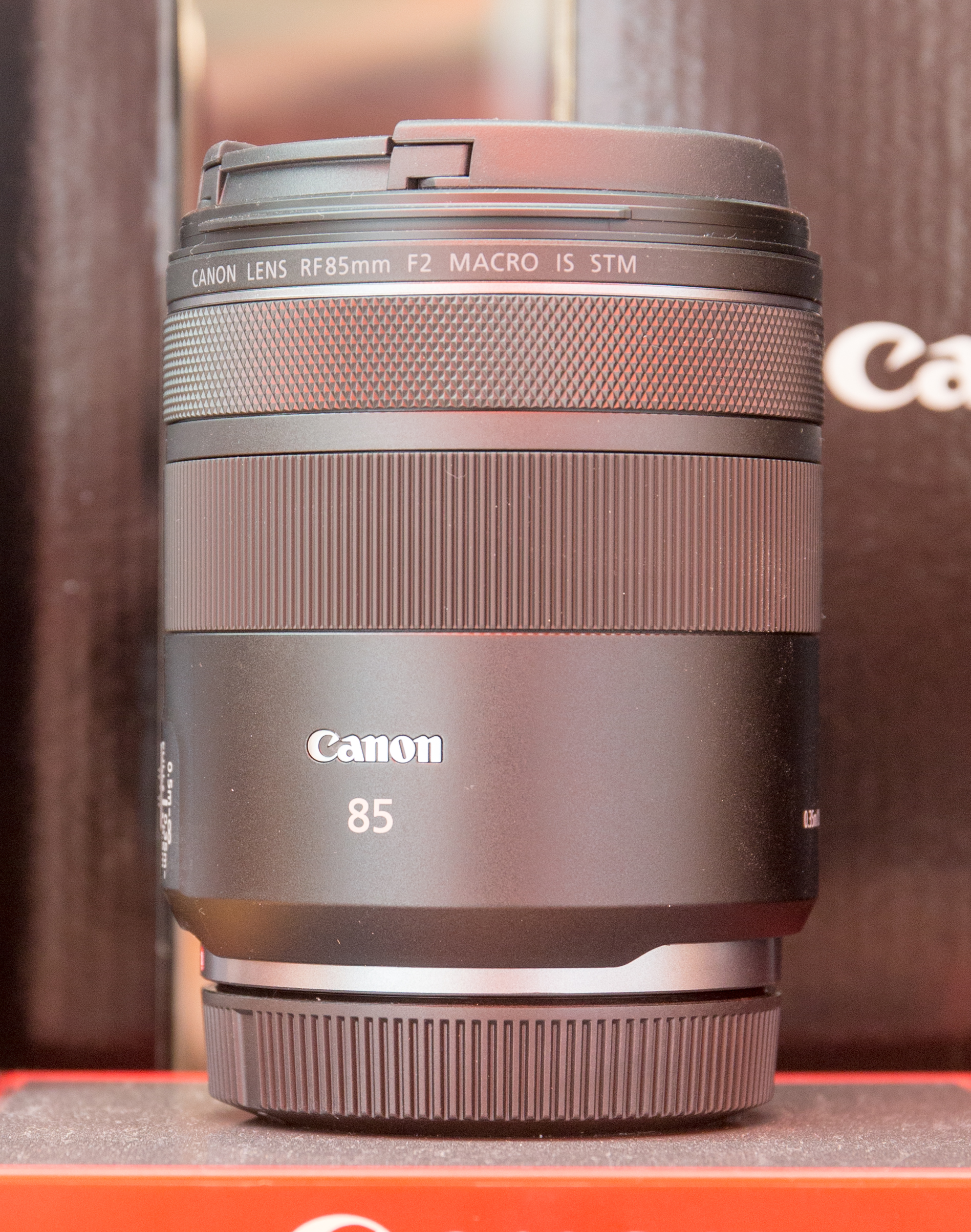
RF 85 mm f/2.0 MACRO IS STM

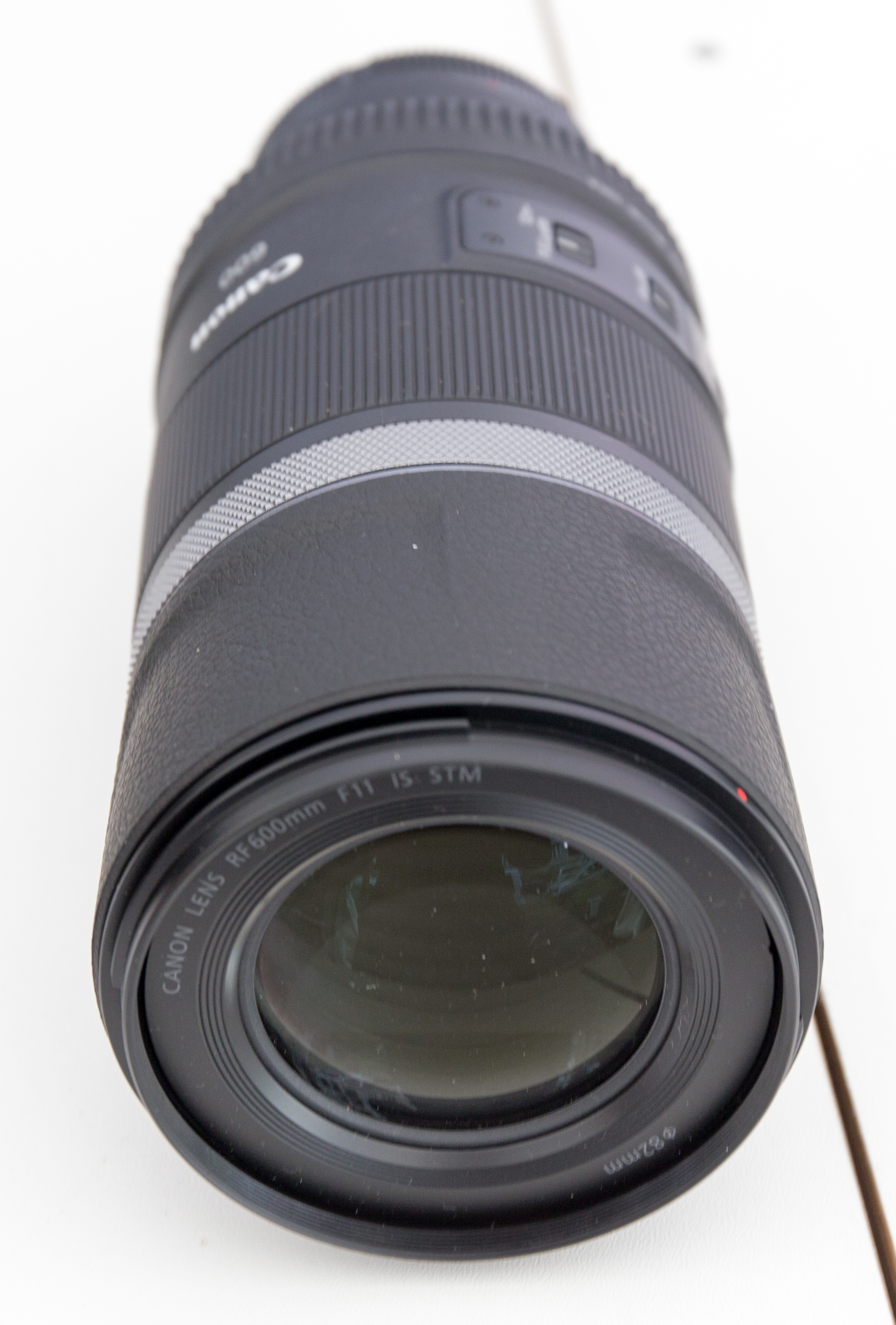
RF 600 mm f/11 IS STM

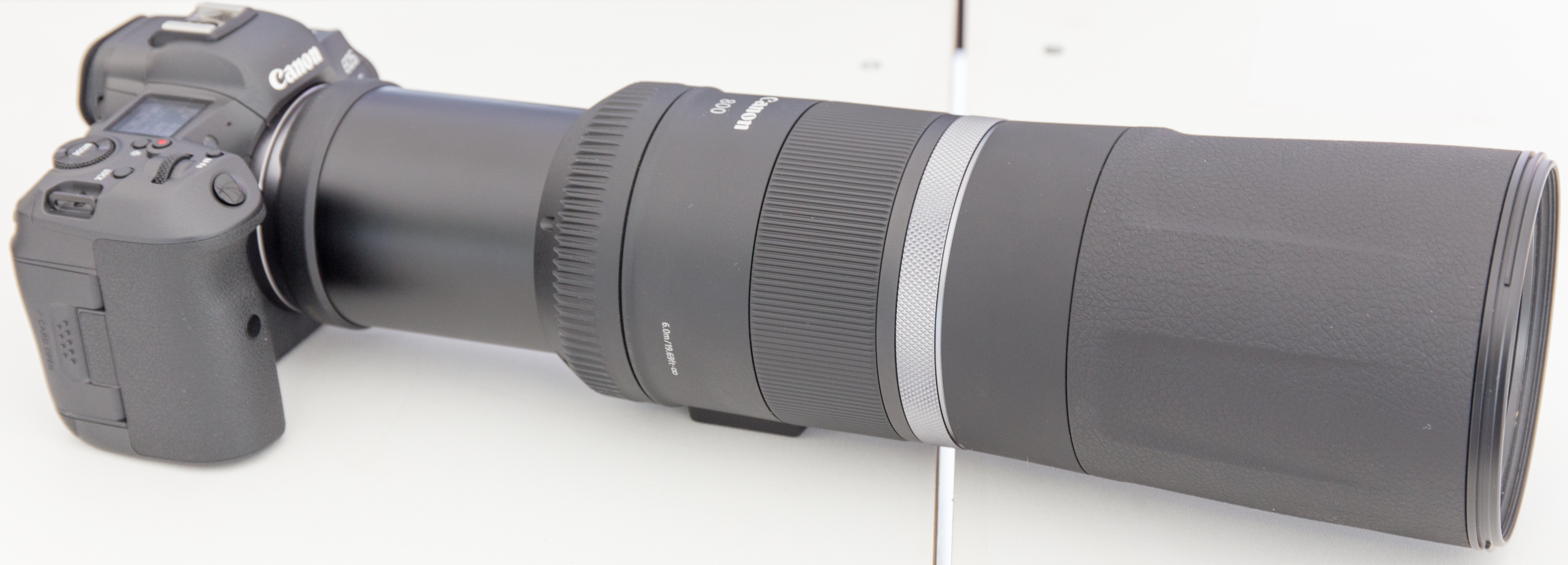
RF 800 mm f/11 IS STM at Canon EOS R5

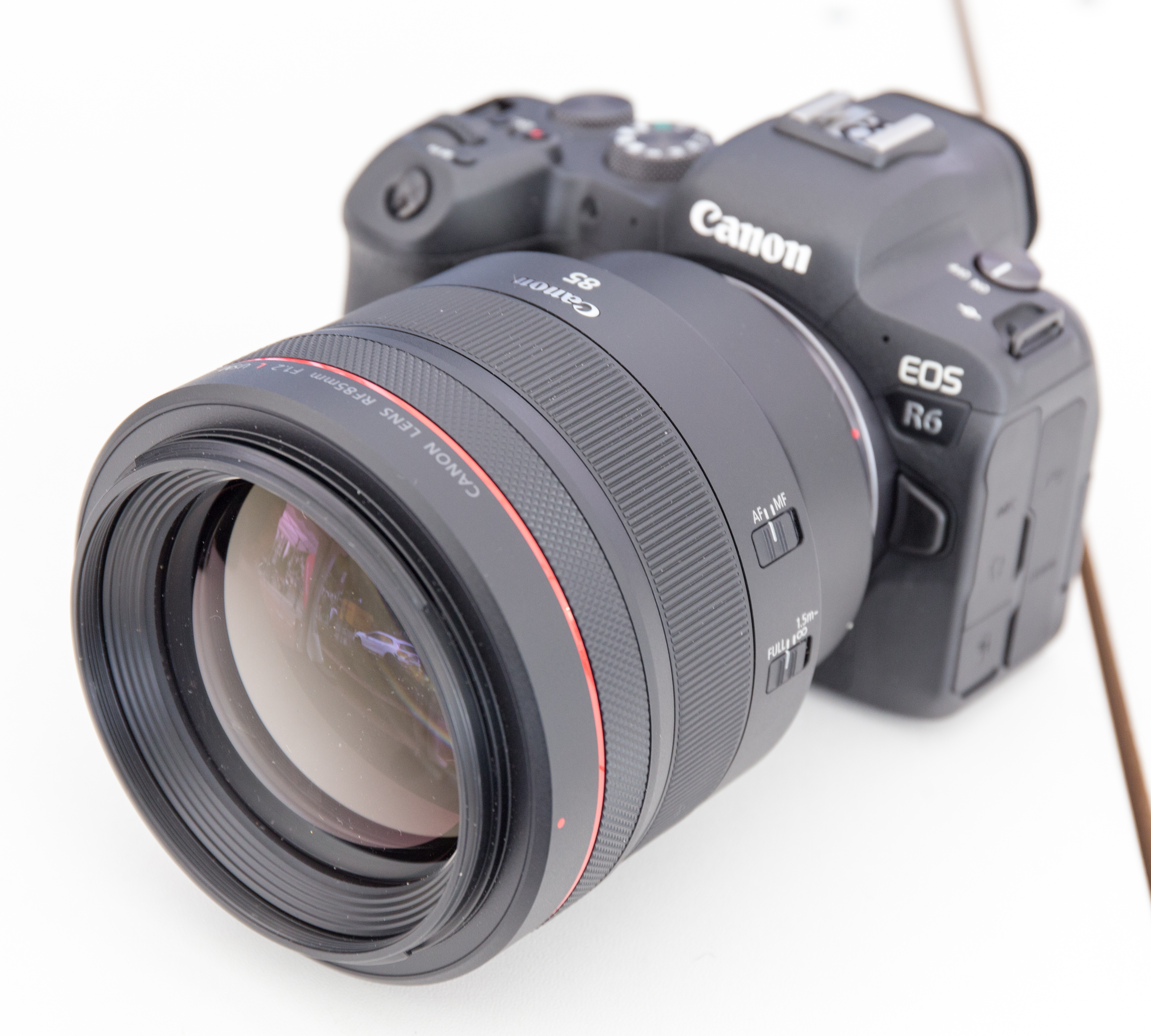
RF 85 mm f/1.2 L USM on a Canon EOS R6

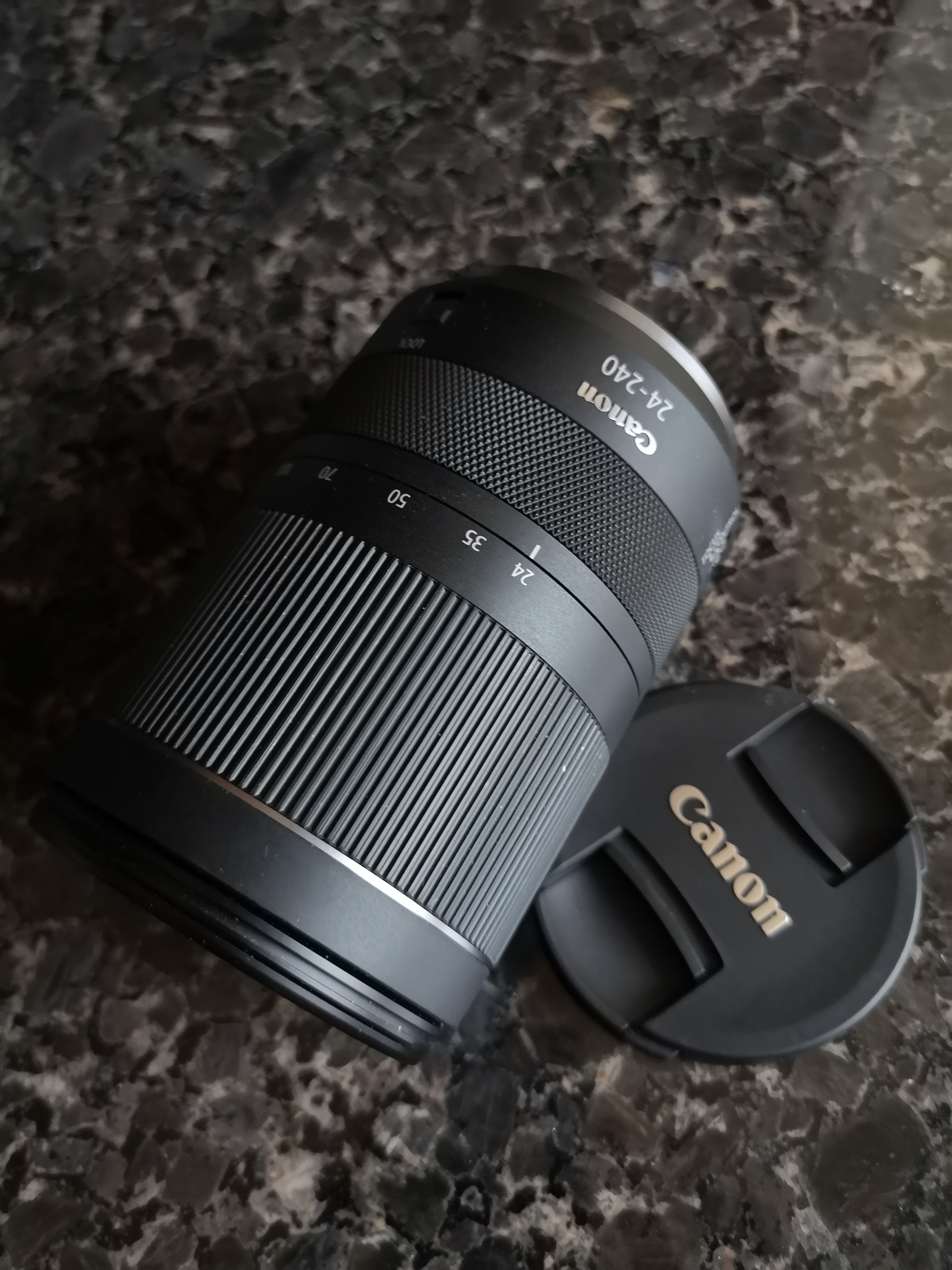
RF 24–240 mm f/4–6.3 IS USM

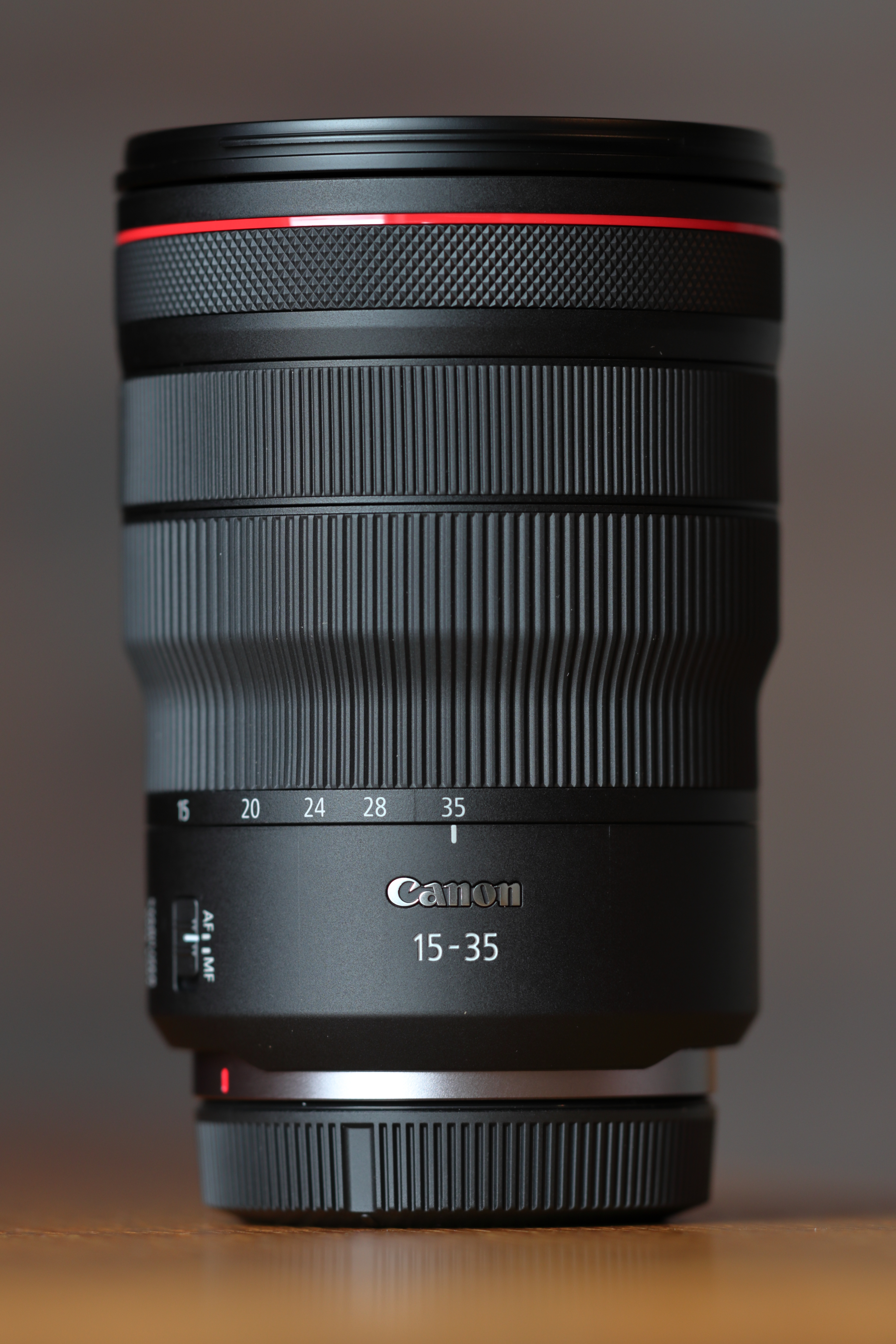
RF 15–35 mm f/2.8 L IS USM

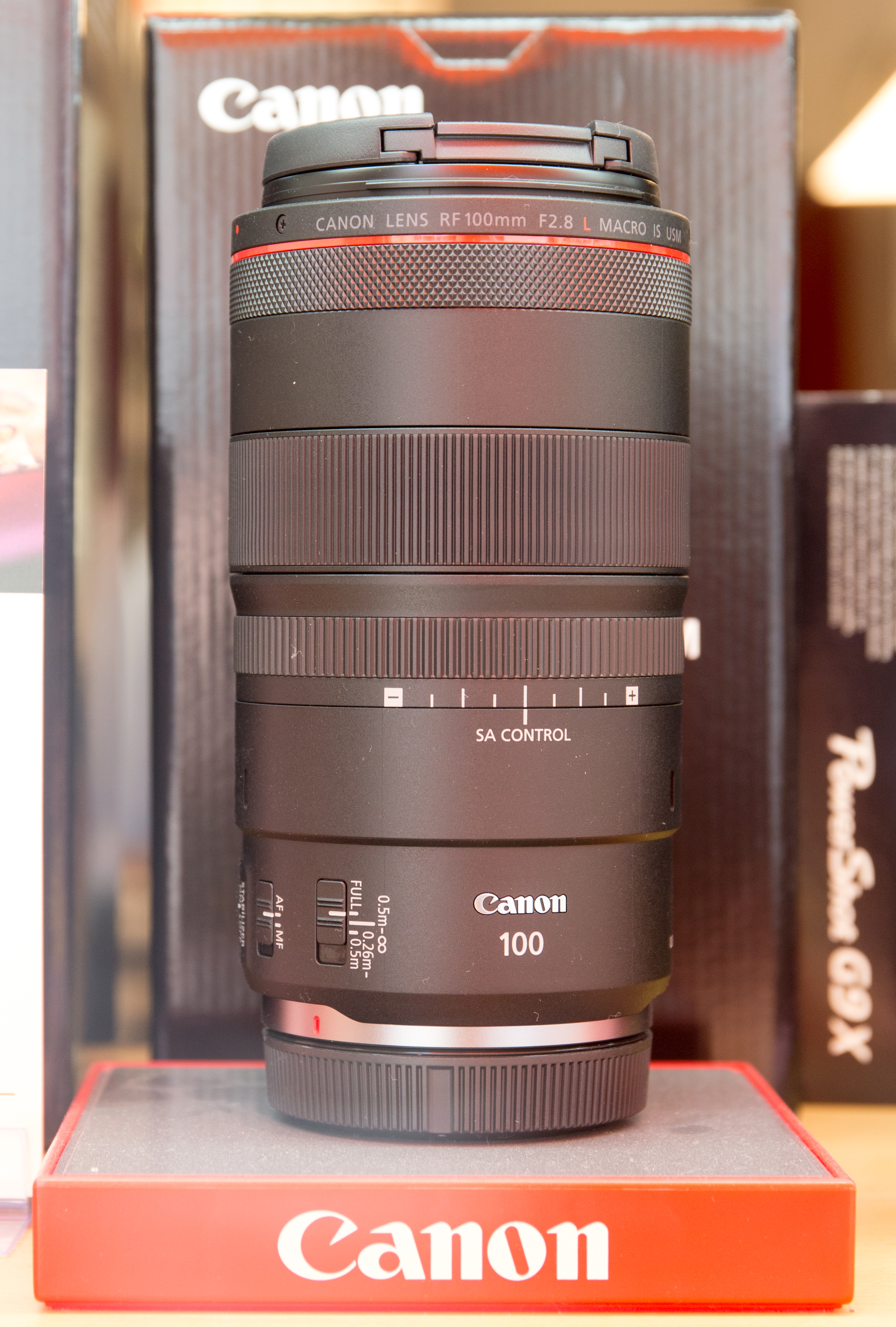
RF 100 mm f/2.8 L IS USM MACRO

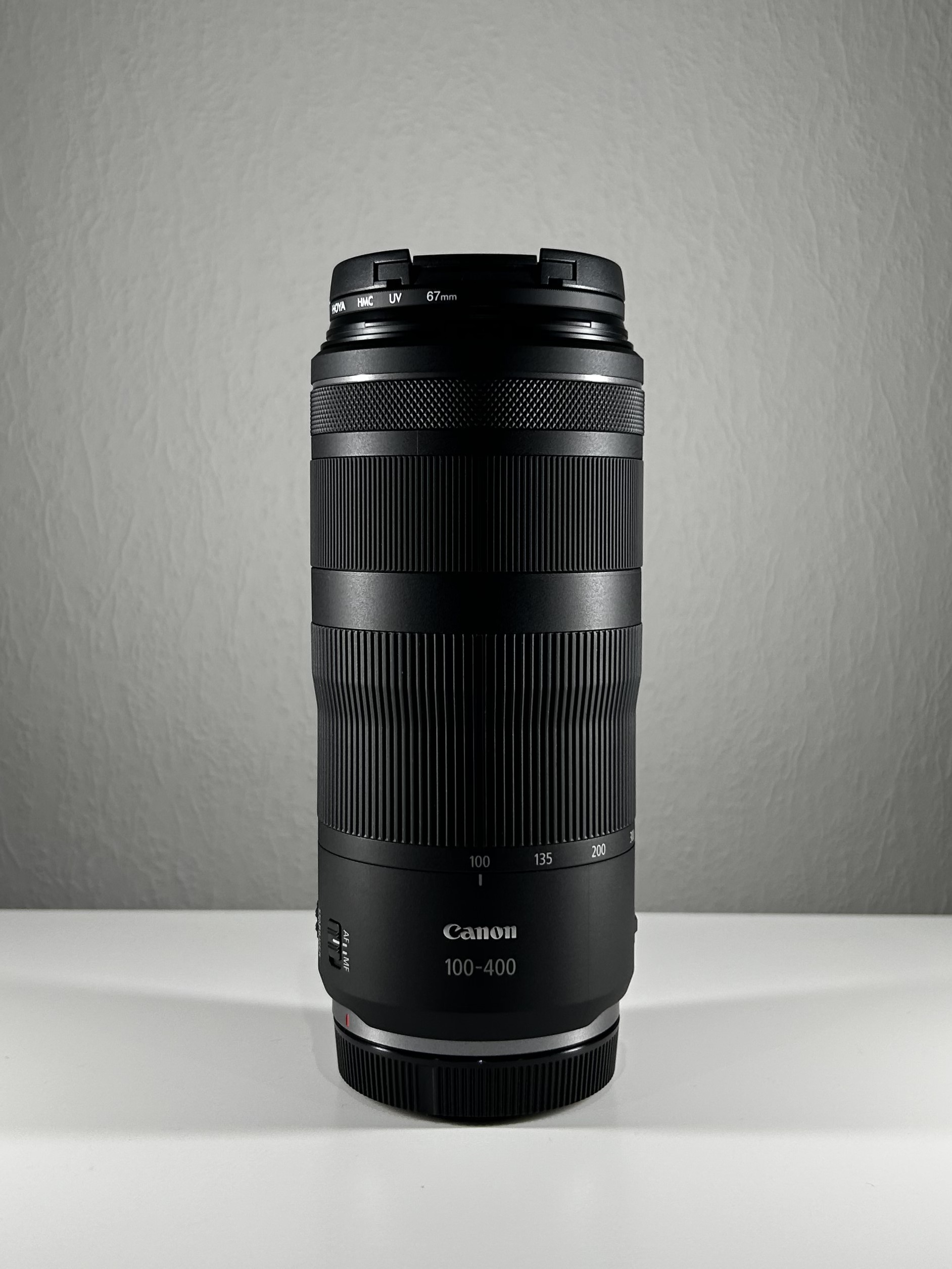
RF 100–400 mm f/5.6–8 IS USM

==== Timeline ====
Type	Focal length	Aperture	2018	2019	2020	2021	2022	2023	2024	2025	2026
Prime	3.9	f/3.5							RF-S 3.9mm f/3.5 STM DUAL FISHEYE		
Prime	5.2	f/2.8				RF 5.2mm f/2.8 L Dual Fisheye					
Prime	7.8	f/4							RF-S 7.8mm f/4 STM Dual Lens VR		
Prime	14	f/1.4									RF 14mm f/1.4 L VCM
Prime	16	f/2.8				RF 16mm f/2.8 STM					
Prime	20	f/1.4								RF 20mm f/1.4 L VCM	
Prime	24	f/1.4							RF 24mm f/1.4 L VCM		
Prime	24	f/1.8					RF 24mm f/1.8 Macro IS STM				
Prime	28	f/2.8						RF 28mm f/2.8 STM			
Prime	35	f/1.4							RF 35mm f/1.4 L VCM		
Prime	35	f/1.8	RF 35mm f/1.8 Macro IS STM								
Prime	45	f/1.2								RF 45mm f/1.2 STM	
Prime	50	f/1.2	RF 50mm f/1.2 L USM								
Prime	50	f/1.4							RF 50mm f/1.4 L VCM		
Prime	50	f/1.8			RF 50mm f/1.8 STM						
Prime	85	f/1.2		RF 85mm f/1.2 L USM							
Prime	85	f/1.2		RF 85mm f/1.2 L USM DS							
Prime	85	f/2			RF 85mm f/2 Macro IS STM						
Prime	100	f/2.8				RF 100mm f/2.8 L Macro IS USM					
Prime	135	f/1.8					RF 135mm f/1.8 L IS USM				
Prime	400	f/2.8				RF 400mm f/2.8 L IS USM |(combinable: RF 1.4× & RF 2×)					
Prime	600	f/4				RF 600mm f/4 L IS USM |(combinable: RF 1.4× & RF 2×)					
Prime	600	f/11			RF 600mm f/11 IS STM |(combinable: RF 1.4× & RF 2×)						
Prime	800	f/5.6					RF 800mm f/5.6 L IS USM | (combinable: RF 1.4× & RF 2×)				
Prime	800	f/11			RF 800mm f/11 IS STM | (combinable: RF 1.4× & RF 2×)						
Prime	1200	f/8					RF 1200mm f/8 L IS USM | (combinable: RF 1.4× & RF 2×)				
Zoom
Zoom	7–14	f/2.8–3.5									RF 7-14mm f/2.8–3.5 L FISHEYE STM
Zoom	10–18	f/4.5–6.3						RF-S 10–18mm f/4.5–6.3 IS STM			
Zoom	10–20	f/4						RF 10–20mm f/4 L IS STM			
Zoom	14–30	f/4–6.3								RF-S 14–30mm f/4–6.3 IS STM PZ	
Zoom	14–35	f/4				RF 14–35mm f/4 L IS USM					
Zoom	15–30	f/4.5–6.3					RF 15–30mm f/4.5–6.3 IS STM				
Zoom	15–35	f/2.8		RF 15–35mm f/2.8 L IS USM							
Zoom	16–28	f/2.8								RF 16–28mm f/2.8 IS STM	
Zoom	18–45	f/4.5–6.3					RF-S 18–45mm f/4.5–6.3 IS STM				
Zoom	18–150	f/3.5–6.3					RF-S 18–150mm f/3.5–6.3 IS STM				
Zoom	20–50	f/4.0									RF 20-50MM f/4.0 L IS USM PZ
Zoom	24–50	f/4.5–6.3						RF 24–50mm f/4.5–6.3 IS STM			
Zoom	24–70	f/2.8		RF 24–70mm f/2.8 L IS USM							
Zoom	24–105	f/2.8						RF 24–105mm f/2.8 L IS USM Z			
Zoom	24–105	f/4.0	RF 24–105mm f/4 L IS USM								
Zoom	24–105	f/4–7.1			RF 24–105mm f/4–7.1 IS STM						
Zoom	24–240	f/4–6.3		RF 24–240mm f/4–6.3 IS USM							
Zoom	28–70	f/2.0	RF 28–70mm f/2 L USM								
Zoom	28–70	f/2.8							RF 28–70mm f/2.8 IS STM		
Zoom	55–210	f/5–7.1						RF-S 55–210mm f/5–7.1 IS STM			
Zoom	70–200	f/2.8		RF 70–200mm f/2.8 L IS USM							
Zoom	70–200	f/2.8							RF 70-200mm f/2.8 L IS USM Z		
Zoom	70–200	f/4			RF 70–200mm f/4 L IS USM						
Zoom	75–300	f/4–5.6								RF 75–300mm f/4–5.6	
Zoom	100–300	f/2.8						RF 100–300mm f/2.8 L IS USM			
Zoom	100–400	f/5.6–8				RF 100–400mm f/5.6–8 IS USM | (combinable: RF 1.4× & RF 2×)					
Zoom	100–500	f/4.5–7.1			RF 100–500mm f/4.5–7.1 L IS USM (combinable: RF 1.4× & RF 2×)						
Zoom	200–800	f/6.3–9						RF 200–800mm f/6.3–9 IS USM			
Teleconverter					Extender RF 1.4×						
Teleconverter					Extender RF 2×						
Adapter			Mount Adapter EF-EOS R								
Adapter			Control Ring Mount Adapter EF-EOS R								
Adapter			Drop-In Filter Mount Adapter EF-EOS R								
Type	Focal length	Aperture	2018	2019	2020	2021	2022	2023	2024	2025	2026
legend			L lenses	USM lenses	STM lenses	DC lenses					

=== Third-party lenses ===
Note: The Samyang, Yongnuo, and Viltrox autofocus lenses are discontinued due to requests by Canon.

Currently, Canon allows third parties to produce manual-focus lenses, as well as autofocus lenses that cover only the APS-C image circle (equivalent to Canon RF-S lenses). For example, all Sigma lenses in this list are "DC" lenses, the company's designation for lenses made for APS-C cameras.

Third-party RF-mount lenses
Lens	Focal length (mm)	Aperture range	Introduced	Autofocus	Macro	IS	DO	Filter size	Lens diameter	Lens length	Weight	Manufacturer	Ref.
12 mm f/2.8 Fisheye	12	f/2.8		No	No	No	No	—N/a	90 mm (3.5 in)	115 mm (4.5 in)	757.5 g (26.72 oz)	AstrHori	
18 mm f/8 Shift	18	f/8		No	No	No	No	58 mm	62 mm (2.4 in)	36 mm (1.4 in)	164 g (5.8 oz)	AstrHori	
18 mm f/8 2X Macro	18	f/8		No	Yes	No	No	—N/a	60 mm (2.4 in)	466 mm (18.3 in)	716 g (25.3 oz)	AstrHori	
28 mm f/13 2X Macro	28	f/13		No	Yes	No	No	—N/a	60 mm (2.4 in)	457 mm (18.0 in)	698 g (24.6 oz)	AstrHori	
50 mm f/1.4 Tilt	50	f/1.4		No	No	No	No	46 mm	50 mm (2.0 in)	75 mm (3.0 in)	339 g (12.0 oz)	AstrHori	
50 mm f/2	50	f/2		No	No	No	No	52 mm	58 mm (2.3 in)	52 mm (2.0 in)	320 g (11 oz)	AstrHori	
85 mm f/2.8 Macro Tilt	85	f/2.8		No	Yes	No	No	55 mm	63 mm (2.5 in)	110 mm (4.3 in)	750 g (26 oz)	AstrHori	
Cine 11 mm T 4.3	11	T 4.3		No	No	No	No	—N/a	95 mm (3.7 in)	129.5 mm (5.10 in)	1,175.8 g (41.48 oz)	Irix	
Cine 15 mm T 2.6	15	T 2.6		No	No	No	No	86 mm	95 mm (3.7 in)	115 mm (4.5 in)	969.4 g (34.19 oz)	Irix	
AF 85 mm f/1.4 autofocus	85	f/1.4	2023	Yes	No	No	No	77 mm				Meike	
AF 14 mm f/2.8 RF	14	f/2.8	2019	Yes	No	No	No	rear Filter	86 mm (3.4 in)	95.3 mm (3.75 in)	484 g (17.1 oz)	Samyang/Rokinon	
MF 14 mm f/2.8 RF	14	f/2.8	2019	No	No	No	No	—N/a	87 mm (3.4 in)	120.1 mm (4.73 in)	800 g (28 oz)	Samyang	
AF 85 mm f/1.4 RF	85	f/1.4	2020	Yes	No	No	No	77 mm	88 mm (3.5 in)	99.5 mm (3.92 in)	582 g (20.5 oz)	Samyang/Rokinon	
MF 85 mm f/1.4 RF	85	f/1.4	2019	No	No	No	No	72 mm	78 mm (3.1 in)	98.7 mm (3.89 in)	730 g (26 oz)	Samyang	
Art 17–40mm F1.8 DC	17–40	f/1.8	2025	Yes	No	No	No	67 mm	72.9 mm (2.87 in)	115.9 mm (4.56 in)	560 g (20 oz)	Sigma	
Contemporary 10–18mm F2.8 DC DN	10–18	f/2.8	2024	Yes	No	No	No	67 mm	72.2 mm (2.84 in)	62 mm (2.4 in)	270 g (9.5 oz)	Sigma	
Contemporary 12mm F1.4 DC	12	f/1.4	2025	Yes	No	No	No	62 mm	69 mm (2.7 in)	67.4 mm (2.65 in)	250 g (8.8 oz)	Sigma	
Contemporary 15mm F1.4 DC	15	f/1.4	2026	Yes	No	No	No	58 mm	69 mm (2.7 in)	62.8 mm (2.47 in)	240 g (8.5 oz)	Sigma	
Contemporary 16mm F1.4 DC DN	16	f/1.4	2025	Yes	No	No	No	67 mm	69 mm (2.7 in)	90.3 mm (3.56 in)	415 g (14.6 oz)	Sigma	
Contemporary 16–300mm F3.5–6.7 DC OS	16–300	f/3.5–6.7	2025	Yes	No	Yes	No	67 mm	73.8 mm (2.91 in)	121.4 mm (4.78 in)	625 g (22.0 oz)	Sigma	
Contemporary 18–50mm F2.8 DC DN	18–50	f/2.8	2024	Yes	No	No	No	55 mm	69.2 mm (2.72 in)	74.5 mm (2.93 in)	300 g (11 oz)	Sigma	
Contemporary 23mm F1.4 DC DN	23	f/1.4	2023	Yes	No	No	No	52 mm	69 mm (2.7 in)	76.9 mm (3.03 in)	345 g (12.2 oz)	Sigma	
Contemporary 30mm F1.4 DC DN	30	f/1.4	2024	Yes	No	No	No	52 mm	69 mm (2.7 in)	76.9 mm (3.03 in)	345 g (12.2 oz)	Sigma	
Contemporary 56mm F1.4 DC DN	56	f/1.4	2024	Yes	No	No	No	55 mm	69 mm (2.7 in)	57.5 mm (2.26 in)	290 g (10 oz)	Sigma	
11–20mm F2.8 Di III-A RXD	11–20	f/2.8	2024	Yes	No	No	No	67 mm	73 mm (2.9 in)	84.2 mm (3.31 in)	340 g (12 oz)	Tamron	
17-70mm F/2.8 Di III-A VC RXD	17-70	f/2.8	2026	Yes	No	No	No	67 mm	74.6 mm (2.94 in)	119.3 mm (4.70 in)	530 g (19 oz)	Tamron	
18–300mm F/3.5-6.3 Di III-A VC VXD	18–300	f/3.5–6.3	2025	Yes	No	Yes	No	67 mm	75.5 mm (2.97 in)	123.6 mm (4.87 in)	625 g (22.0 oz)	Tamron	
AF 85mm F1.8 RF	85	f/1.8	2021	Yes	No	No	No	72 mm	80 mm (3.1 in)	98 mm (3.9 in)	530 g (19 oz)	Viltrox	
40mm F1.2 Aspherical NOKTON	40	f/1.2		No	No	No	No	58 mm (2.3 in)	70.8 mm (2.79 in)	56.4 mm (2.22 in)	400 g (14 oz)	Voigtländer	
50mm F1.0 Nokton	50	f/1.0	2023	No	No	No	No	67 mm	79.3 mm (3.12 in)	64 mm (2.5 in)	650 g (23 oz)	Voigtländer	
75mm F1.5 Aspherical NOKTON	75	f/1.5	2024	No	No	No	No	62 mm (2.4 in)	74 mm (2.9 in)	71.5 mm (2.81 in)	525 g (18.5 oz)	Voigtländer	
YN35mm F2R DF DSM	35	f/2.0	2021	Yes	No	No	No	52 mm	67 mm (2.6 in)	72 mm (2.8 in)	280 g (9.9 oz)	Yongnuo	
YN85mm F1.8R DF DSM	85	f/1.8	2021	Yes	No	No	No	58 mm	67 mm (2.6 in)	88 mm (3.5 in)	380 g (13 oz)	Yongnuo	
Otus ML 1.4/35	35	f/1.4	2026	No	No	No	No	67 mm	67 mm (2.6 in)	101 mm (4.0 in)	717 g (25.3 oz)	Zeiss	
Otus ML 1.4/50	50	f/1.4		No	No	No	No	67 mm	77 mm (3.0 in)	100 mm (3.9 in)	697 g (24.6 oz)	Zeiss	
Otus ML 1.4/85	85	f/1.4		No	No	No	No	77 mm	88 mm (3.5 in)	111 mm (4.4 in)	1,055 g (37.2 oz)	Zeiss	
Mitakon Speedmaster 20mm T1.0 S35 Cine	20	T 1.0		No	No	No	No	77 mm	88 mm (3.5 in)	93 mm (3.7 in)	730 g (26 oz)	Zhongyi Optics	
Mitakon Creator 28mm f/5.6 Lens	28	f/5.6		No	No	No	No	37 mm	51 mm (2.0 in)	44 mm (1.7 in)	130 g (4.6 oz)	Zhongyi Optics	
Mitakon Speedmaster Cinema Lens 35mm T1.0	35	T 1.0		No	No	No	No	77 mm	92 mm (3.6 in)	80 mm (3.1 in)	615 g (21.7 oz)	Zhongyi Optics	
Mitakon Speedmaster 35mm f/0.95	35	f/0.95		No	No	No	No	55 mm	63 mm (2.5 in)	60 mm (2.4 in)	460 g (16 oz)	Zhongyi Optics	
Mitakon Speedmaster 50mm f/0.95 III	50	f/0.95		No	No	No	No	67 mm	73.3 mm (2.89 in)	83.5 mm (3.29 in)	720 g (25 oz)	Zhongyi Optics	
Mitakon Speedmaster 90mm f/1.5 Lens	90	f/1.5		No	No	No	No	67 mm	74 mm (2.9 in)	102 mm (4.0 in)	770 g (27 oz)	Zhongyi Optics	
Mitakon Creator 135mm f/2.5 Lens	135	f/2.5		No	No	No	No	67 mm	79 mm (3.1 in)	137 mm (5.4 in)	845 g (29.8 oz)	Zhongyi Optics	
Mitakon 200mm f/4 1x Macro Lens	200	f/4.0		No	Yes	No	No	67 mm	75 mm (3.0 in)	186 mm (7.3 in)	1,300 g (46 oz)	Zhongyi Optics	

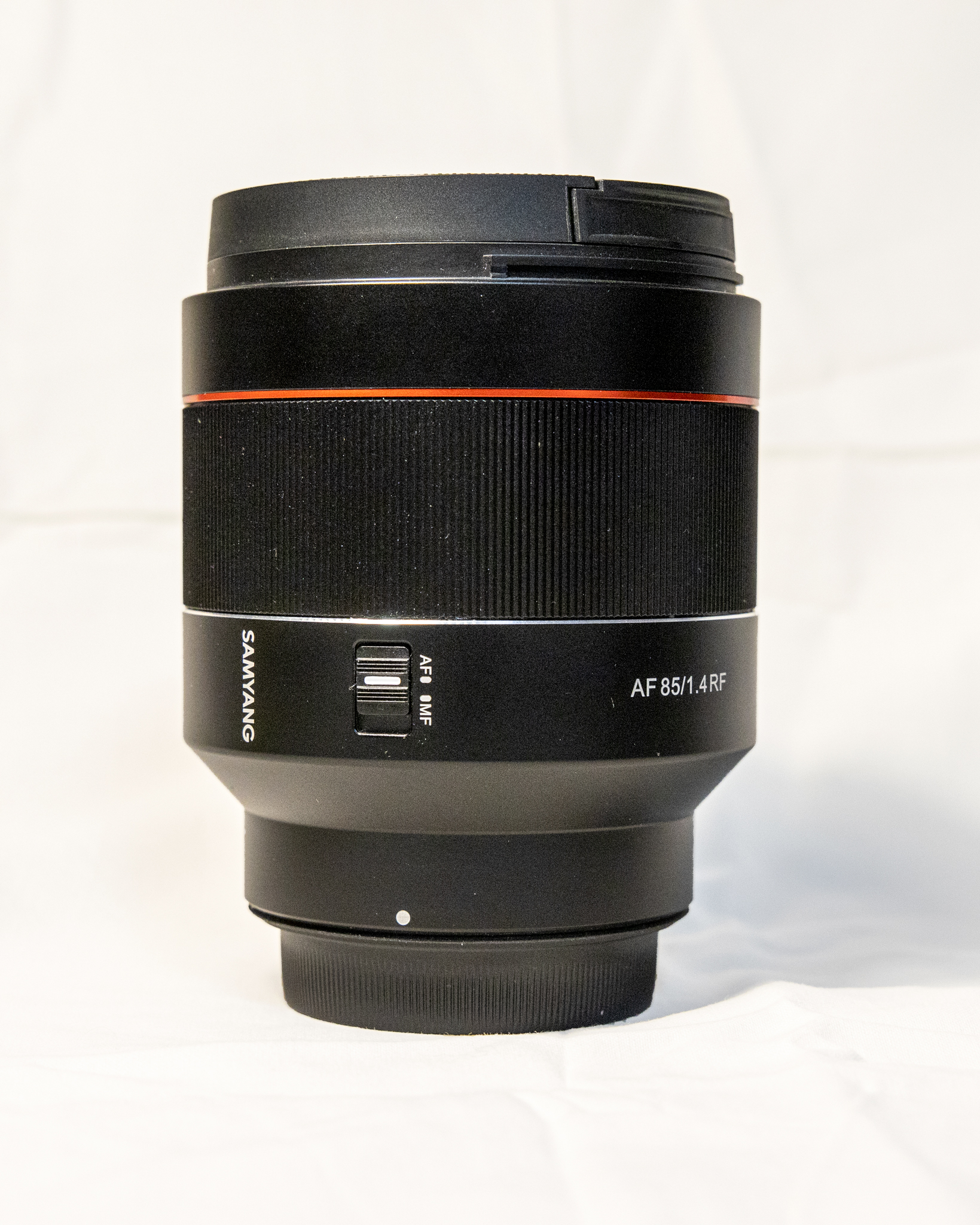
Samyang AF 85 mm f/1.4 RF

== See also ==
- Canon EF-M lens mount
- Canon EF lens mount
- Nikon Z-mount
- Sony E-mount

Sensor	Class	12	13	14	15	16	17	18	19	20	21	22	23	24	25	26
Full-frame	Flagship														_{m} R1 ^{ATS}	
Full-frame	Professional											_{m} R3 ^{ATS}				
Full-frame	Professional										R5 ^{ATSR}				_{m} R5 Mk II ^{ATSR}	
Full-frame	Professional											_{m} R5 C ^{ATCR}				
Full-frame	Advanced										R6 ^{ATS}		_{m} R6 Mk II ^{ATS}			_{m} R6 Mk III ^{ATS}
Full-frame	Advanced															R6 V ^{ATS}
Full-frame	Advanced									Ra ^{AT}						
Full-frame	Advanced								R ^{AT}							
Full-frame	Midrange													_{m} R8 ^{AT}		_{m} R8 Mk II ^{ATS}
Full-frame	Entry/mid								RP ^{AT}							
APS-C	Advanced												_{m} R7 ^{ATS}			
APS-C	Midrange						M5 ^{FT}						_{m} R10 ^{AT}			
APS-C	Entry/mid		_{x} M ^{T}	M2 ^{T}	M3 ^{FT}			M6 ^{FT}		M6 Mk II ^{FT}						
APS-C	Entry/mid								M50 ^{AT}		M50 Mk II ^{AT}			_{m} R50 ^{AT}		
APS-C	Entry/mid															_{m} R50 V ^{AT}
APS-C	Entry					M10 ^{FT}		M100 ^{FT}		M200 ^{FT}				R100		
Sensor	Class															
Sensor	Class	12	13	14	15	16	17	18	19	20	21	22	23	24	25	26
