= Fujifilm X-T5 =

2022 APS-C mirrorless camera

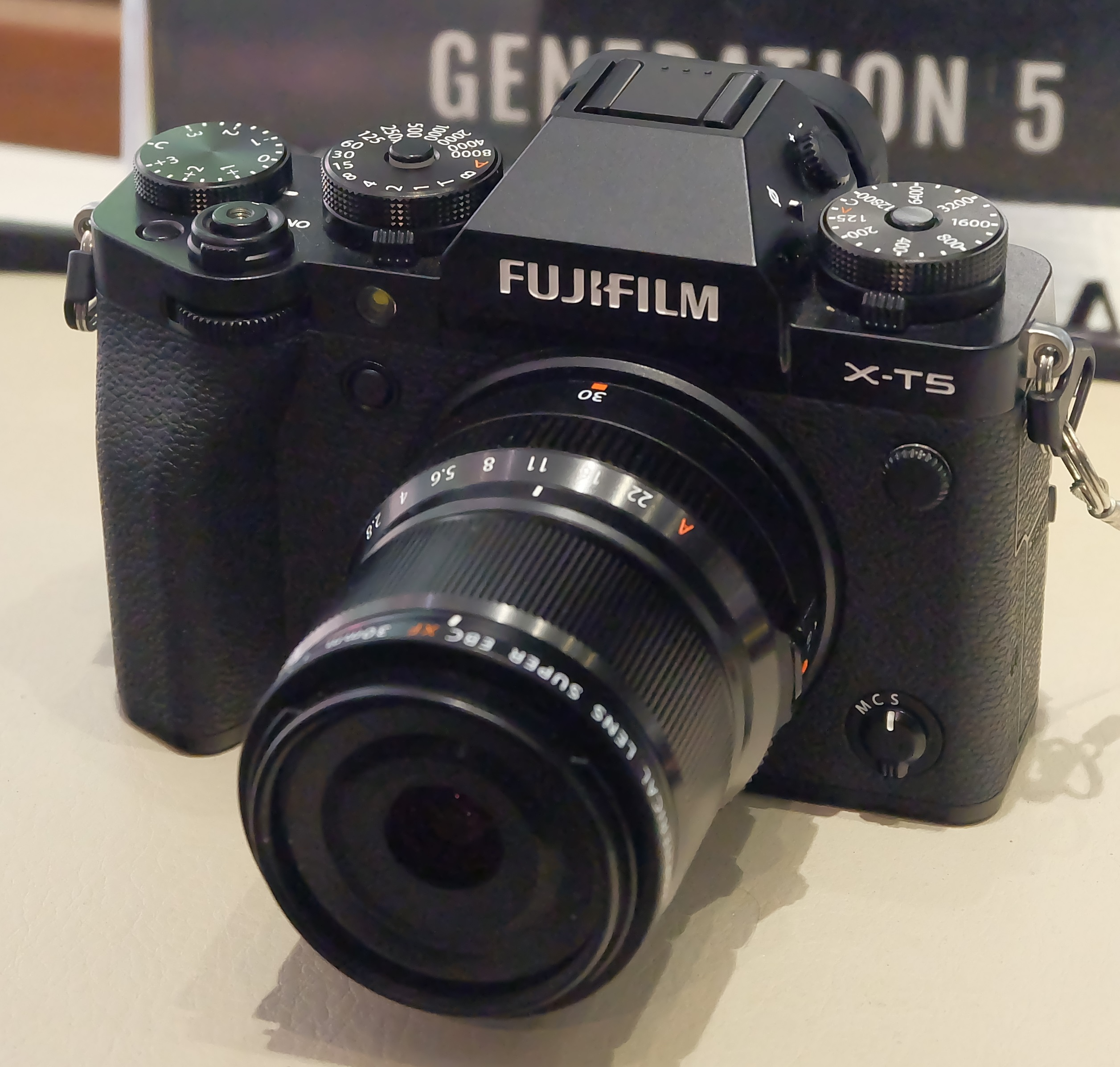
- Fujifilm X-T5 + XF30mm f/2.8 R LM WR Macro

Overview
- Maker: Fujifilm
- Type: MILC
- Released: 25 November 2022; 3 years ago
- Intro price: USD 1,699; JPY 253,000

Lens
- Lens mount: Fujifilm X
- Lens: Interchangeable lens
- Compatible lenses: Fujinon

Sensor/medium
- Sensor: APS-C
- Sensor type: X-Trans CMOS 5 HR
- Sensor size: 23.8 mm × 15.6 mm
- Sensor maker: Sony
- Maximum resolution: 40.20 megapixels 7728 x 5152 (3:2)
- Film speed: 125–12800 (standard); 64–51200 (extend)
- Storage media: Dual Slot SD, SDHC, SDXC; V90, UHS-II, UHS-I

Focusing
- Focus: Intelligent Hybrid TTL contrast detection / Phase detection
- Focus modes: Single point, Zone, Wide/Tracking
- Focus areas: 117 focus point
- Focus bracketing: Auto, Manual

Exposure/metering
- Exposure: TTL 256-zone metering
- Exposure modes: Program AE, Aperture Priority AE, Shutter Speed Priority AE, Manual Exposure
- Exposure metering: Through-the-lens
- Metering modes: Multi, Spot, Average, Center Weighted

Flash
- Flash: External Flash
- Flash synchronization: 1/250 s
- Flash bracketing: ±1/3EV, ±2/3EV, ±1EV
- Compatible flashes: external option

Shutter
- Shutter: Focal Plane Shutter
- Shutter speeds: 4 s to 1/8000 s (mechanical), 4 s to 1/180000 s (electronic)
- Continuous shooting: 15 fps(mechanical), 20 fps(electronic, 1.29x crop)

Viewfinder
- Viewfinder: EVF viewfinder with eye sensor
- Electronic viewfinder: 0.5" 3.69M dots OLED
- Viewfinder magnification: 0.80
- Frame coverage: 100%

Image processing
- Image processor: X-Processor 5
- White balance: Auto, Custom, Preset, Fluorescent, Incandescent, Underwater; 2500K - 10000K
- WB bracketing: ±1 - ±5
- Dynamic range bracketing: AUTO, 100%, 200%, 400%

General
- Video recording: MP4 / MOV; 6.2K 30p, DCI4K HQ 30p, Full HD 60p
- LCD screen: 3.0" 1.62M dots touchscreen 3-way tilting
- Battery: NP-W235 Li-ion (USB rechargeable)
- AV port(s): HDMI D, ⌀3.5 mm & ⌀2.5 mm audio jack
- Data port: USB-C 3.2, Wi-Fi 5, Bluetooth 4.2
- Body features: In-Body Image Stabilization, Weather sealed, Pixel-shift multishot
- Dimensions: 129.5 mm × 91 mm × 63.8 mm (5.10 in × 3.58 in × 2.51 in)
- Weight: 557 g (20 oz) (1.228 lb) including battery and memory cards
- Made in: China

Chronology
- Predecessor: Fujifilm X-T4

The Fujifilm X-T5 is a mirrorless interchangeable-lens digital camera announced on November 2, 2022. It is the successor to 2020's X-T4 with improved autofocus, higher resolution and reduced body size. The 40.2 megapixels X-Trans 5 HR sensor is the highest-resolution APS-C sensor currently on the market.

== Key features ==
The X-T5 is a mirrorless compact camera made by Fujifilm. It measures 130 mm x 91 mm x 64 mm and weighs 557 g including memory card and battery. Mechanical dials are provided for key operations, including shutter speed, ISO sensitivity, exposure compensation, drive modes and metering modes. It lacks built-in flash, and does not include a flash unit.

- 40.2 megapixels X-Trans CMOS 5 HR sensor.
- 7-Stop 5-axis in-body image stabilization
- Weather resistant structure
- 4K 60p, 6.2K 30p, FHD 240p 10-Bit Video
- 425-Point Intelligent Hybrid AF System
- 3.69m-Dot OLED Electronic Viewfinder
- 3″ 1.84m-Dot Tilting Touchscreen LCD
- 20 fps E. Shutter, 15 fps Mech. Shutter
- 160MP Pixel Shift Multi-Shot
- Bluetooth and Wi-Fi Connectivity
- ProRes & Blackmagic RAW via HDMI
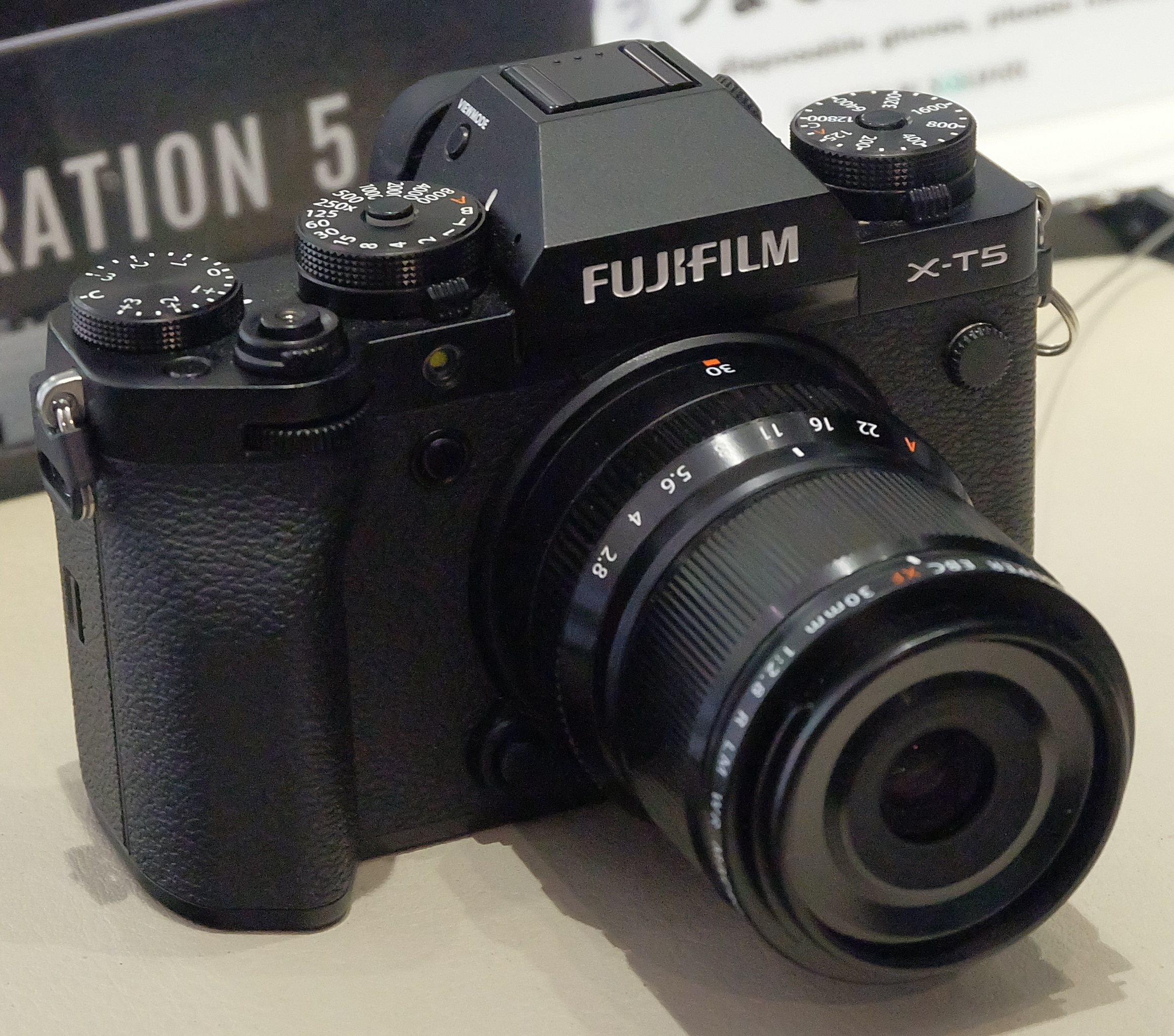

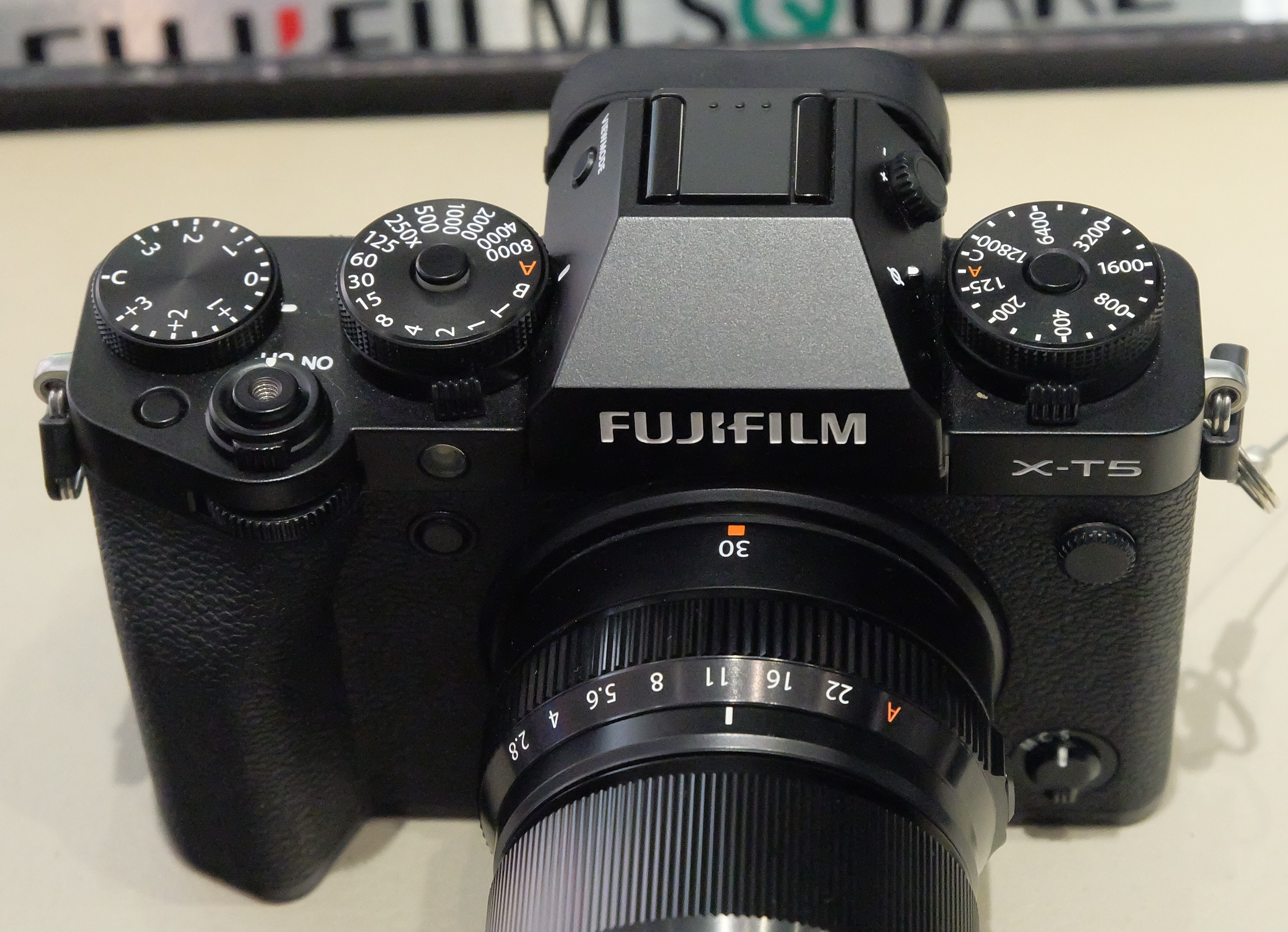

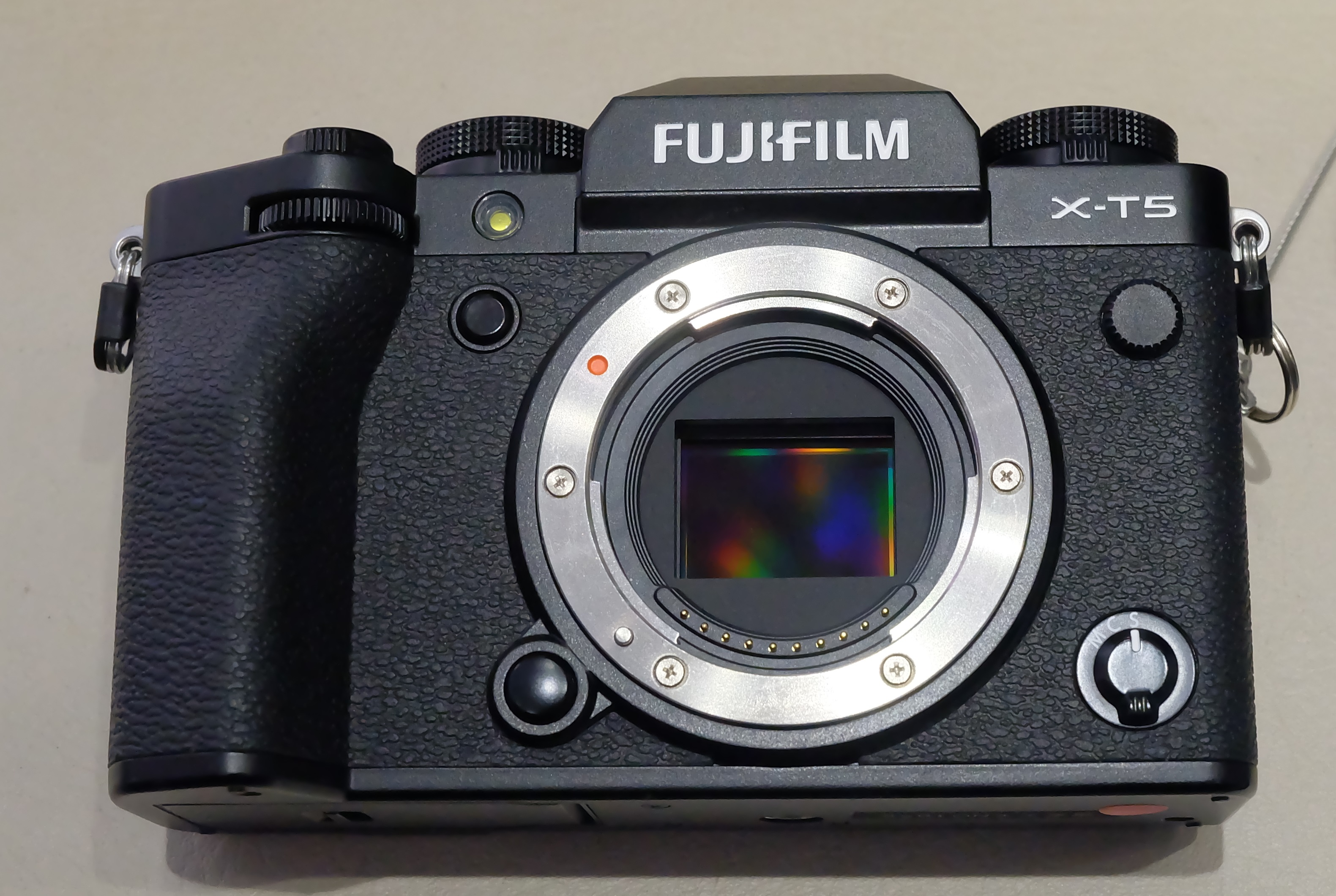

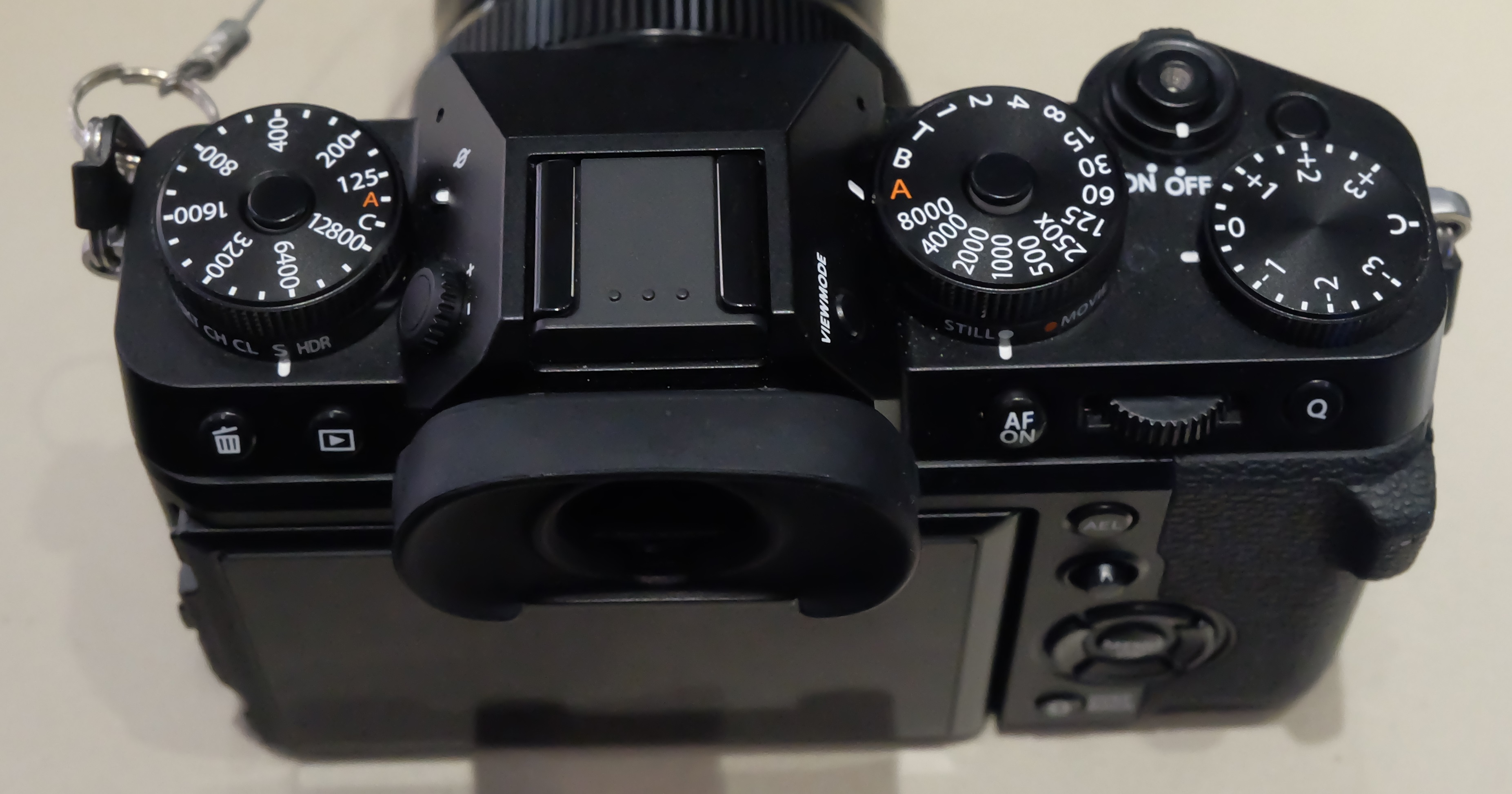

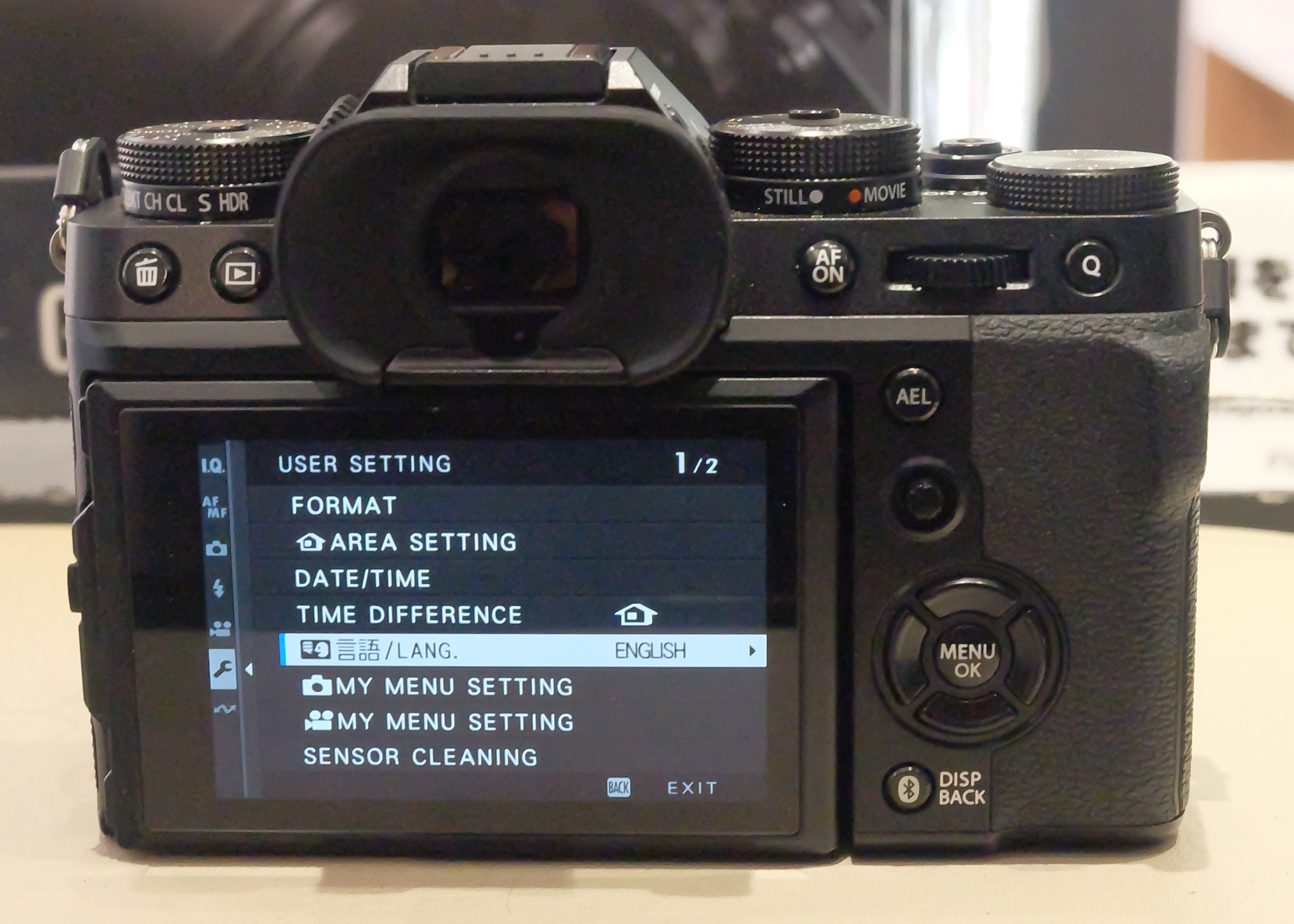

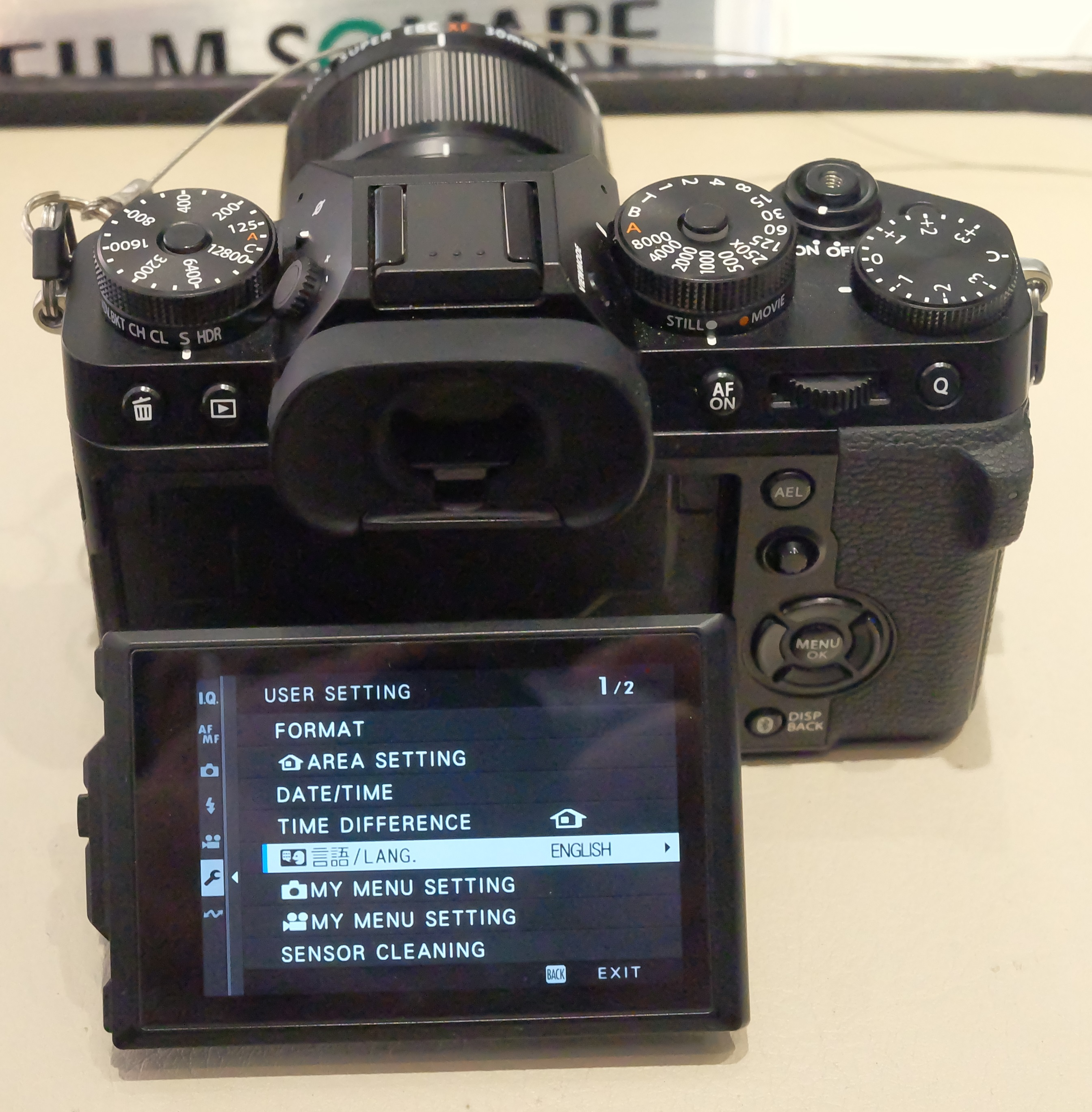

== See also ==
- List of retro-style digital cameras

| Type | Lens | 2011 | 2012 | 2013 | 2014 | 2015 | 2016 | 2017 | 2018 | 2019 | 2020 | 2021 | 2022 | 2023 | 2024 | 2025 | 2026 |
| MILC | G-mount; Medium format sensor | | | | | | | GFX 50S ^{F} ^{T} | | | | | GFX 50S II ^{F} ^{T} | | | | |
| MILC | G-mount; Medium format sensor | | | | | | | | | GFX 50R ^{F} ^{T} | | | | | | | |
| MILC | G-mount; Medium format sensor | | | | | | | | | | GFX 100 ^{F} ^{T} | | | | | GFX 100 II ^{F} ^{T} | |
| MILC | G-mount; Medium format sensor | | | | | | | | | | | GFX 100 IR ^{F} ^{T} | | | | | |
| MILC | G-mount; Medium format sensor | | | | | | | | | | | GFX 100S ^{F} ^{T} | | | | GFX 100S II ^{F} ^{T} | |
| MILC | G-mount; Medium format sensor | | | | | | | | | | | | | | | GFX Eterna 55 ^{F} ^{T} | |
| MILC | Prime lens Medium format sensor | | | | | | | | | | | | | | | GFX 100RF ^{F} ^{T} | |
| MILC | X-mount; APS-C sensor | | X-Pro1 | | | | X-Pro2 | | | | X-Pro3 ^{f} ^{T} | | | | | | |
| MILC | X-mount; APS-C sensor | | | | | | | | X-H1 ^{F} ^{T} | | | | | X-H2 ^{A} ^{T} | | | |
| MILC | X-mount; APS-C sensor | | | | | | | | | | | | | X-H2S ^{A} ^{T} | | | |
| MILC | X-mount; APS-C sensor | | | | | | | | | | | X-S10 ^{A} ^{T} | | | X-S20 ^{A} ^{T} | | |
| MILC | X-mount; APS-C sensor | | | | X-T1 ^{f} | | | X-T2 ^{F} | | X-T3 ^{F} ^{T} | | X-T4 ^{A} ^{T} | | X-T5 ^{F} ^{T} | | | |
| MILC | X-mount; APS-C sensor | | | | | | | | | | | | | | | X-T50 ^{f} ^{T} | |
| MILC | X-mount; APS-C sensor | | | | | | X-T10 ^{f} | X-T20 ^{f} ^{T} | | X-T30 ^{f} ^{T} | | | X-T30 II ^{f} ^{T} | | | X-T30 III ^{f} ^{T} | |
| MILC | X-mount; APS-C sensor | | | | | | | | | _{15} X-T100 ^{F} ^{T} | X-T200 ^{A} ^{T} | | | | | | |
| MILC | X-mount; APS-C sensor | | | X-E1 | X-E2 | | X-E2s | | X-E3 ^{T} | | | X-E4 ^{f} ^{T} | | | | X-E5 ^{f} ^{T} | |
| MILC | X-mount; APS-C sensor | | | | X-M1 ^{f} | | | | | | | | | | | X-M5 ^{A} ^{T} | |
| MILC | X-mount; APS-C sensor | | | | X-A1 ^{f} | X-A2 ^{f} | | X-A3 ^{f} ^{T} | _{15} X-A5 ^{f} ^{T} | | X-A7 ^{A} ^{T} | | | | | | |
| MILC | X-mount; APS-C sensor | | | | | | | X-A10 ^{f} | X-A20 ^{f} ^{T} | | | | | | | | |
| Compact | Prime lens APS-C sensor | X100 | | X100S | | X100T | | X100F | | | X100V ^{f} ^{T} | | | | X100VI ^{f} ^{T} | | |
| Compact | Prime lens APS-C sensor | | | | | | X70 ^{f} ^{T} | | | XF10 ^{T} | | | | | | | |
| Compact | Prime lens 1" sensor | | | | | | | | | | | | | | | X half ^{T} | |
| Compact | Zoom lens^{2}/_{3}" sensor | | X10 | X20 | | X30 ^{f} | | | | | | | | | | | |
| Compact | Zoom lens^{2}/_{3}" sensor | | | | XQ1 | XQ2 | | | | | | | | | | | |
| Compact | Zoom lens^{2}/_{3}" sensor | | | XF1 | | | | | | | | | | | | | |
| Bridge | ^{2}/_{3}" sensor | | X-S1 ^{f} | | | | | | | | | | | | | | |
| Type | Lens | | | | | | | | | | | | | | | | |
| Type | Lens | 2011 | 2012 | 2013 | 2014 | 2015 | 2016 | 2017 | 2018 | 2019 | 2020 | 2021 | 2022 | 2023 | 2024 | 2025 | 2026 |
