= Fujifilm X-T1 =

Mirrorless camera model

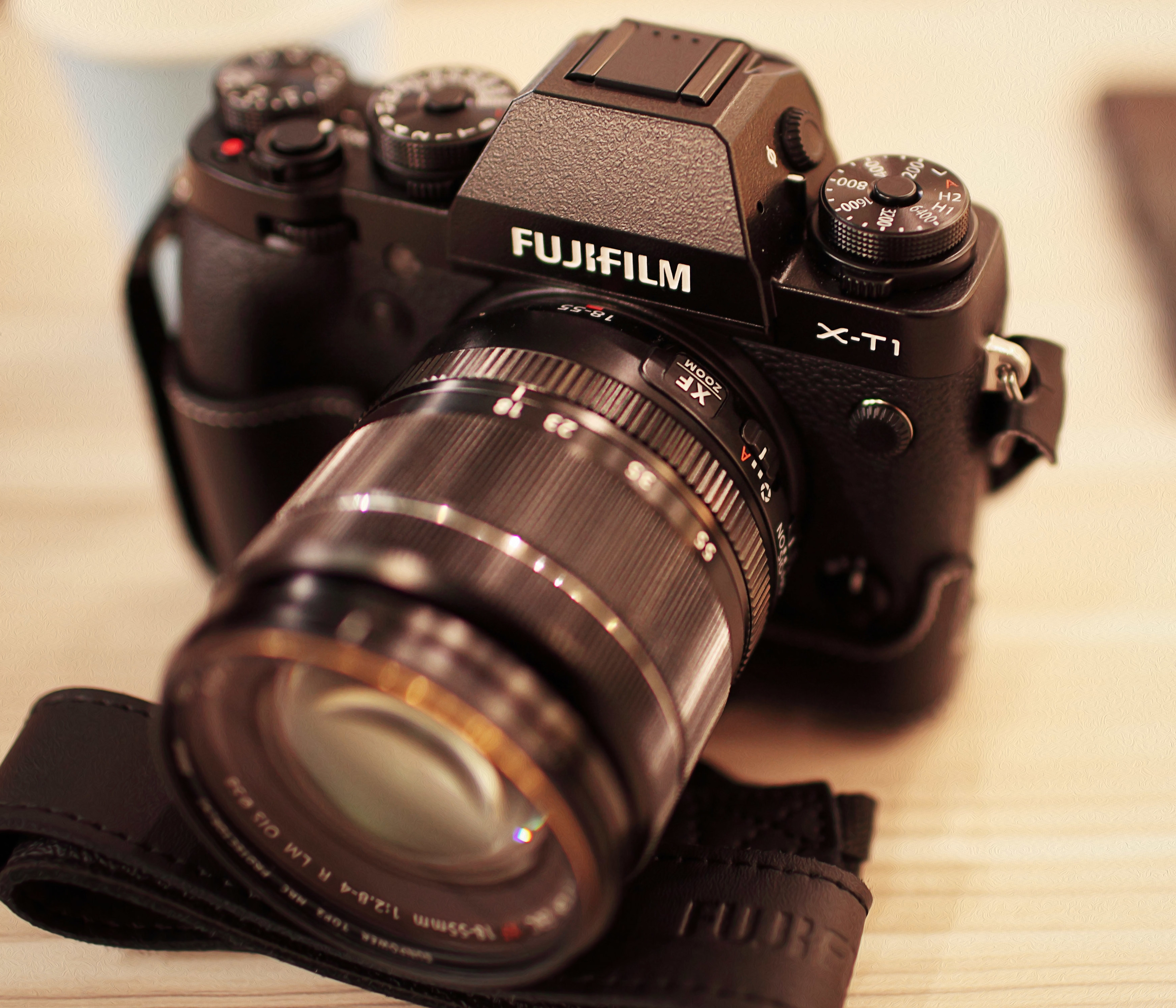
- Fujifilm X-T1 with 18-55mm lens

Overview
- Maker: Fujifilm
- Type: MILC
- Released: 27 January 2014
- Intro price: USD 1,299 (body), USD 1,899 (kit)

Lens
- Lens mount: Fujifilm X
- Lens: Interchangeable lens

Sensor/medium
- Sensor type: X-Trans CMOS II
- Sensor size: 23.6 mm × 15.6 mm (APS-C)
- Maximum resolution: 4896*3264 (16 megapixels)
- Film speed: 200–6400 (standard); 100–51200 (extend)
- Recording medium: SD, SDHC, SDXC (UHS-II)
- Storage media: SD Card (UHS-II)

Focusing
- Focus: Intelligent Hybrid TTL contrast detection / Phase detection
- Focus modes: Single point, Zone, Wide/Tracking
- Focus areas: 49 focus point

Exposure/metering
- Exposure: TTL 256-zone metering
- Exposure bracketing: AE Bracketing
- Exposure modes: Program, Aperture Priority, Shutter Speed Priority, Manual Exposure
- Metering modes: Multi, Spot, Average

Flash
- Flash: External
- Compatible flashes: EF-X8 Shoe Mount Flash

Shutter
- Shutter: Focal Plane Shutter
- Shutter speeds: 4 s to 1/4000 s (mechanical), 1 s to 1/32000 s (electronic)
- Continuous shooting: 8 frames per second

Viewfinder
- Viewfinder: EVF with eye sensor
- Viewfinder magnification: 0.77
- Frame coverage: 100%

Image processing
- White balance: Yes
- WB bracketing: Yes
- Dynamic range bracketing: Yes

General
- Video recording: 1080p up to 60 fps, 720p up to 60 fps
- LCD screen: 3.0 inches 1,040,000 dots tiltscreen
- Battery: NP-W126 Li-ion
- AV port: HDMI C
- Data port: USB 2.0, Wi-Fi 4
- Dimensions: 129 mm × 89.8 mm × 46.7 mm (5.08 in × 3.54 in × 1.84 in)
- Weight: 440 g (16 oz) (0.97 lb) including battery and memory card
- Made in: Japan

Chronology
- Successor: Fujifilm X-T2

The Fujifilm X-T1 is a weather-resistant mirrorless interchangeable lens camera announced by Fujifilm on January 28, 2014. It uses the Fujifilm X-mount and is the first entry in the X-T lineage of SLR-styled X series cameras.

The X-T2 was announced as the successor to the X-T1 on July 7, 2016.

== Features ==
The X-T1 camera body is dust- and water-resistant and also freezeproof down to −10 °C (14 °F). It has a large electronic viewfinder, larger apparent image than the optical viewfinders of some DSLRs such as the Canon EOS-1D X. It has 3 dials on the top-plate of the camera for adjusting ISO, shutter speed, and exposure compensation. It has a tilt-screen. It lacks in-body stabilisation and built-in flash, but includes a flash sync port. A hand grip and battery grip are available as separately sold accessories.

== Reception ==
Shortly after the release of the camera, it was reported that the camera had a light leak through its accessory ports. Fujifilm responded stating that only some cameras from an early production run were affected, and offered to repair affected units free of charge.

Later, the X-T1 won the EISA Award "Best Product 2014" in the category "Advanced Compact System Camera".

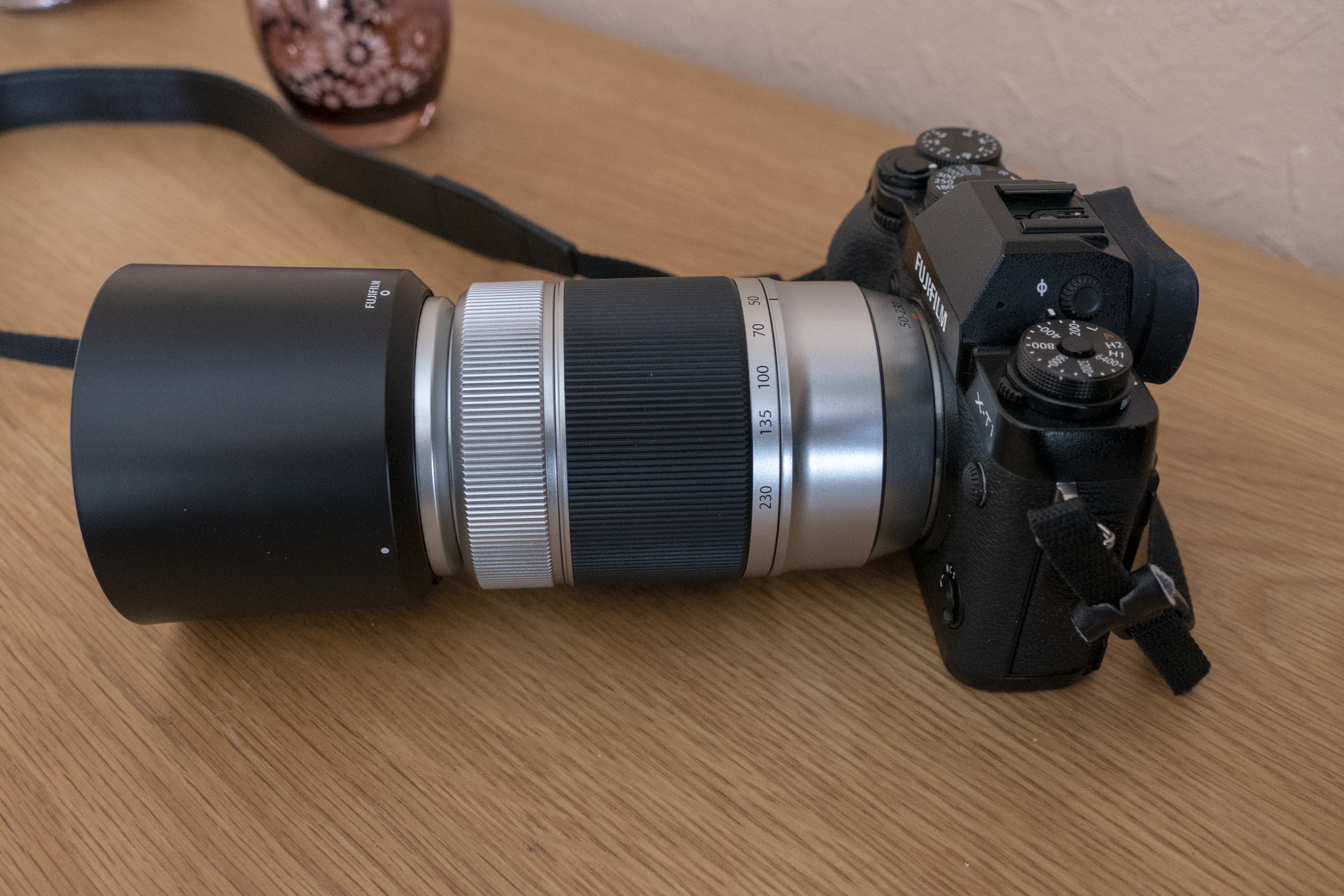
Fujifilm X-T1 with 50-230 lens

== XT-1 IR ==
A full-spectrum version of the X-T1 released in October 2015. The X-T1 IR captures light above and below the visible spectrum — wavelengths from about 380 nanometers to 1,000 nm. This allows the user to capture both infrared as well as the edge of near ultraviolet images. It was developed and marketed specifically for law enforcement (forensic) as well as medical and scientific applications.

== See also ==
- List of retro-style digital cameras

Type	Lens	2011	2012	2013	2014	2015	2016	2017	2018	2019	2020	2021	2022	2023	2024	2025
MILC	G-mount; Medium format sensor							GFX 50S ^{F} ^{T}					GFX 50S II ^{F} ^{T}			
MILC	G-mount; Medium format sensor									GFX 50R ^{F} ^{T}						
MILC	G-mount; Medium format sensor										GFX 100 ^{F} ^{T}					GFX 100 II ^{F} ^{T}
MILC	G-mount; Medium format sensor											GFX 100 IR ^{F} ^{T}				
MILC	G-mount; Medium format sensor											GFX 100S ^{F} ^{T}				GFX 100S II^{F} ^{T}
MILC	G-mount; Medium format sensor															GFX Eterna 55^{F} ^{T}
MILC	Prime lens Medium format sensor															GFX 100RF ^{F} ^{T}
MILC	X-mount; APS-C sensor		X-Pro1				X-Pro2				X-Pro3 ^{f} ^{T}					
MILC	X-mount; APS-C sensor								X-H1 ^{F} ^{T}					X-H2 ^{A} ^{T}		
MILC	X-mount; APS-C sensor													X-H2S ^{A} ^{T}		
MILC	X-mount; APS-C sensor											X-S10 ^{A} ^{T}			X-S20 ^{A} ^{T}	
MILC	X-mount; APS-C sensor				X-T1 ^{f}			X-T2 ^{F}		X-T3 ^{F} ^{T}		X-T4 ^{A} ^{T}		X-T5 ^{F} ^{T}		
MILC	X-mount; APS-C sensor						X-T10 ^{f}	X-T20 ^{f} ^{T}		X-T30 ^{f} ^{T}			X-T30 II ^{f} ^{T}			X-T50 ^{f} ^{T}
MILC	X-mount; APS-C sensor									_{15} X-T100 ^{F} ^{T}	X-T200 ^{A} ^{T}					X-T30 III ^{f} ^{T}
MILC	X-mount; APS-C sensor			X-E1	X-E2		X-E2s		X-E3 ^{T}			X-E4 ^{f} ^{T}				X-E5 ^{f} ^{T}
MILC	X-mount; APS-C sensor				X-M1 ^{f}											X-M5 ^{A} ^{T}
MILC	X-mount; APS-C sensor				X-A1 ^{f}	X-A2 ^{f}		X-A3 ^{f} ^{T}	_{15} X-A5 ^{f} ^{T}		X-A7 ^{A} ^{T}					
MILC	X-mount; APS-C sensor							X-A10 ^{f}	X-A20 ^{f} ^{T}							
Compact	Prime lens APS-C sensor	X100		X100S		X100T		X100F			X100V ^{f} ^{T}				X100VI ^{f} ^{T}	
Compact	Prime lens APS-C sensor						X70 ^{f} ^{T}			XF10 ^{T}						
Compact	Prime lens 1" sensor															X half ^{T}
Compact	Zoom lens^{2}/_{3}" sensor		X10	X20		X30 ^{f}										
Compact	Zoom lens^{2}/_{3}" sensor				XQ1	XQ2										
Compact	Zoom lens^{2}/_{3}" sensor			XF1												
Bridge	^{2}/_{3}" sensor		X-S1 ^{f}													
Type	Lens															
Type	Lens	2011	2012	2013	2014	2015	2016	2017	2018	2019	2020	2021	2022	2023	2024	2025
