= Fujifilm X-T4 =

2020 APS-C mirrorless camera

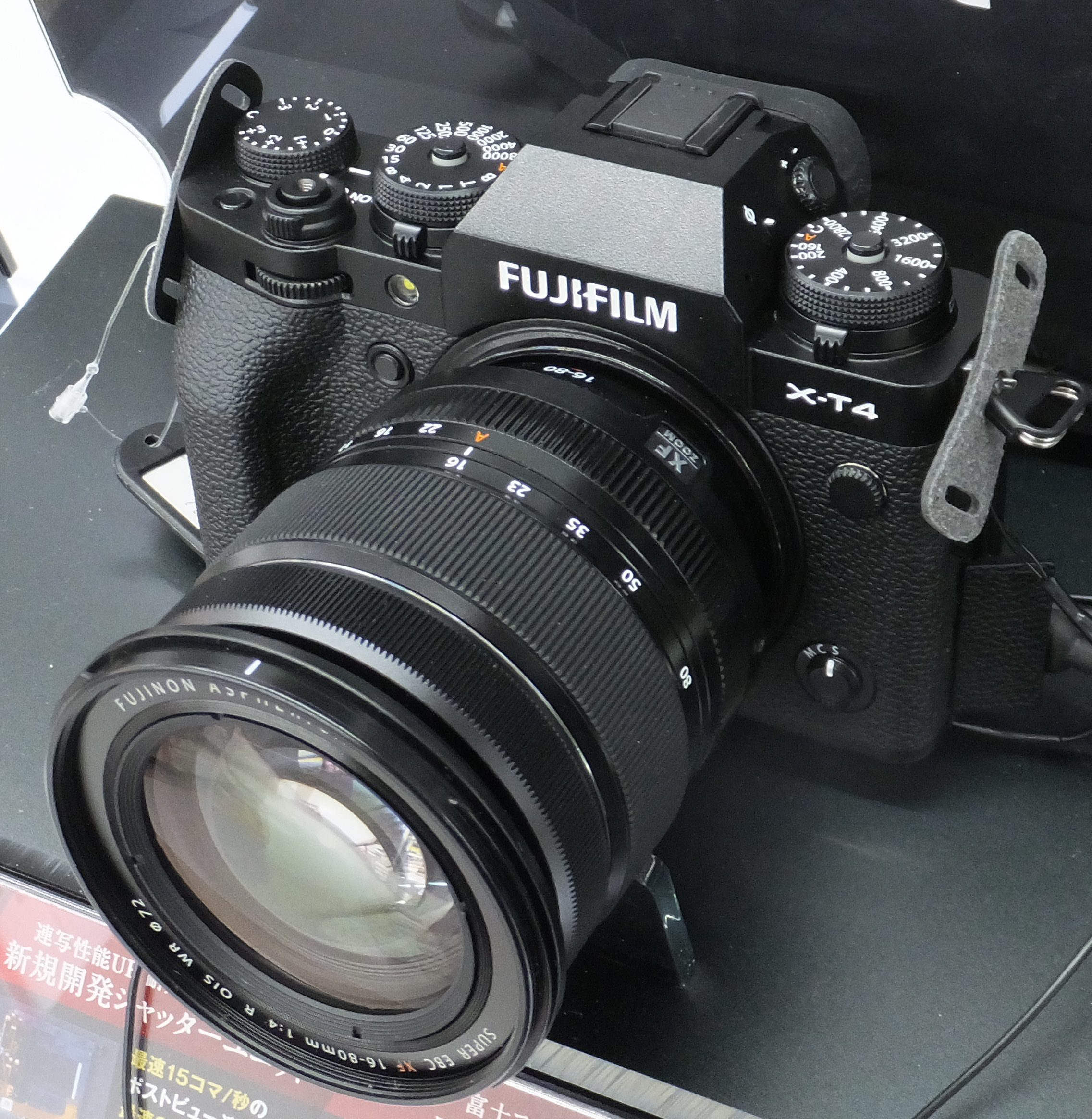
- X-T4 with XF 16-80mm f/4 lens

Overview
- Maker: Fujifilm
- Type: MILC
- Released: 28 April 2020; 6 years ago
- Intro price: USD 1,699 (body), USD 2,199 (kit)

Lens
- Lens mount: Fujifilm X
- Lens: Interchangeable lens
- Compatible lenses: Fujinon

Sensor/medium
- Sensor: APS-C
- Sensor type: X-Trans CMOS 4
- Sensor size: 23.5 mm × 15.6 mm
- Sensor maker: Sony
- Maximum resolution: 26.1 megapixels 6240 x 4160
- Film speed: 160–12800 (standard); 80–51200 (extend)
- Storage media: Dual Slot SD, SDHC, SDXC; V90, UHS-II, UHS-I

Focusing
- Focus: Intelligent Hybrid TTL contrast detection / Phase detection
- Focus modes: Single point, Zone, Wide/Tracking
- Focus areas: 91 focus point
- Focus bracketing: Auto, Manual

Exposure/metering
- Exposure: TTL 256-zone metering
- Exposure modes: Program AE, Aperture Priority AE, Shutter Speed Priority AE, Manual Exposure
- Exposure metering: Through-the-lens
- Metering modes: Multi, Spot, Average, Center Weighted

Flash
- Flash: External Flash
- Flash synchronization: 1/250 s
- Flash bracketing: ±1/3EV, ±2/3EV, ±1EV
- Compatible flashes: EF-X8 Flash, Dedicated TTL Flash

Shutter
- Shutter: Focal Plane Shutter
- Shutter speeds: 4 s to 1/8000 s (mechanical), 4 s to 1/32000 s (electronic)
- Continuous shooting: 30.0 fps

Viewfinder
- Viewfinder: EVF viewfinder with eye sensor
- Electronic viewfinder: 0.5" 3.69M dots OLED
- Viewfinder magnification: 0.75
- Frame coverage: 100%

Image processing
- Image processor: X-Processor 4
- White balance: Auto, Custom, Preset, Fluorescent, Incandescent, Underwater
- WB bracketing: ±1, ±2, ±3
- Dynamic range bracketing: AUTO, 100%, 200%, 400%

General
- Video recording: MP4 / MOV; 4K up to 60 fps, 1080p up to 240 fps
- LCD screen: 3.0" 1.62M dots touchscreen free-angle monitor
- Battery: NP-W235 Li-ion
- Optional battery packs: Battery Grip with 2 adaptable batteries
- AV port(s): HDMI D, ⌀3.5 mm & ⌀2.5 mm audio jack
- Data port: USB-C 3.2, Wi-Fi 4, Bluetooth 4.2
- Body features: In-Body Image Stabilization, Magnesium alloy body with a leather wrap
- Dimensions: 134.6 mm × 92.8 mm × 63.8 mm (5.30 in × 3.65 in × 2.51 in)
- Weight: 607 g (21 oz) (1.338 lb) including battery and memory card
- Made in: China

Chronology
- Predecessor: Fujifilm X-T3
- Successor: Fujifilm X-T5

The Fujifilm X-T4 is a mirrorless interchangeable-lens digital camera announced on February 25, 2020. It has a backside-illuminated X-Trans CMOS 4 APS-C sensor and an X-Processor 4 quad core processor and uses the Fujifilm X-mount. The X-T4 is a weather-resistant camera equipped with a higher-capacity battery designed to last longer than the X-T3. It is the successor to 2018's X-T3, which is a little smaller and lighter.

The X-T4 is capable of recording video in 4K resolution up to 60 fps with a maximum bitrate of 400 Mbit/s. The camera, styled after an SLR, is available in 2 colors, black and silver.

== Comparison with previous Fujifilm XT cameras ==
Compared to its predecessor, the X-T4 has better autofocus capability. Fujifilm says its subject tracking system is faster now that it considers color and shape as well as distance information. It can also shoot 240fps videos at 1080p. The X-T4 is built around a new shutter mechanism, which is one of the changes that allows it to shoot at 15 frames per second. The new mechanism features improved damping and is rated to last 300,000 cycles: twice the rating given to the X-T2 shutter.

== Key features ==
The X-T4 is a mirrorless compact camera made by Fujifilm. It measures 134.6 mm x 92.8 mm x 63.8 mm and weighs 607 g including memory card and battery.

Mechanical dials are provided for key operations, including shutter speed, ISO sensitivity, exposure compensation, drive modes and metering modes. It lacks built-in flash, and does not include a flash unit.

- 26.1 megapixels X-Trans CMOS 4 sensor.
- In-body image stabilization, capable of up to 6.5 stops
- New shutter mechanism with 300,000 actuations
- Weather resistant structure
- Dedicated movie and HDR modes in the dial
- Autofocus joystick
- A new filter, the Eterna Bleach Bypass film simulation
- NP-W235 battery, a higher-capacity battery than with the X-T3, that lasts approximately 500 frames per charge
- X-Processor 4, a quad-core CPU.
- 23.5 mm x 15.6 mm CMOS sensor (APS-C) Fujifilm X-Trans sensor.
- Fully articulated Touch Screen
- Selectable film simulations
- 60 fps shooting in 4K
- Hybrid autofocus
- New Phase detection AF to entire frame
- Up to 30 fps black-out free high-speed continuous shooting
- 4K video up to 60fps 10 bit recording
- 4K Burst, 4K Multi Focus
- Headphone and Microphone sockets
- USB-C which can be used for charging battery
- Wi-Fi and Bluetooth connectivity for connection and tagging via a smartphone
- UHS-II SD card dual slot with a removable SD card door
- New vertical grip, housing two additional batteries.
- Available in silver and black in a magnesium alloy body
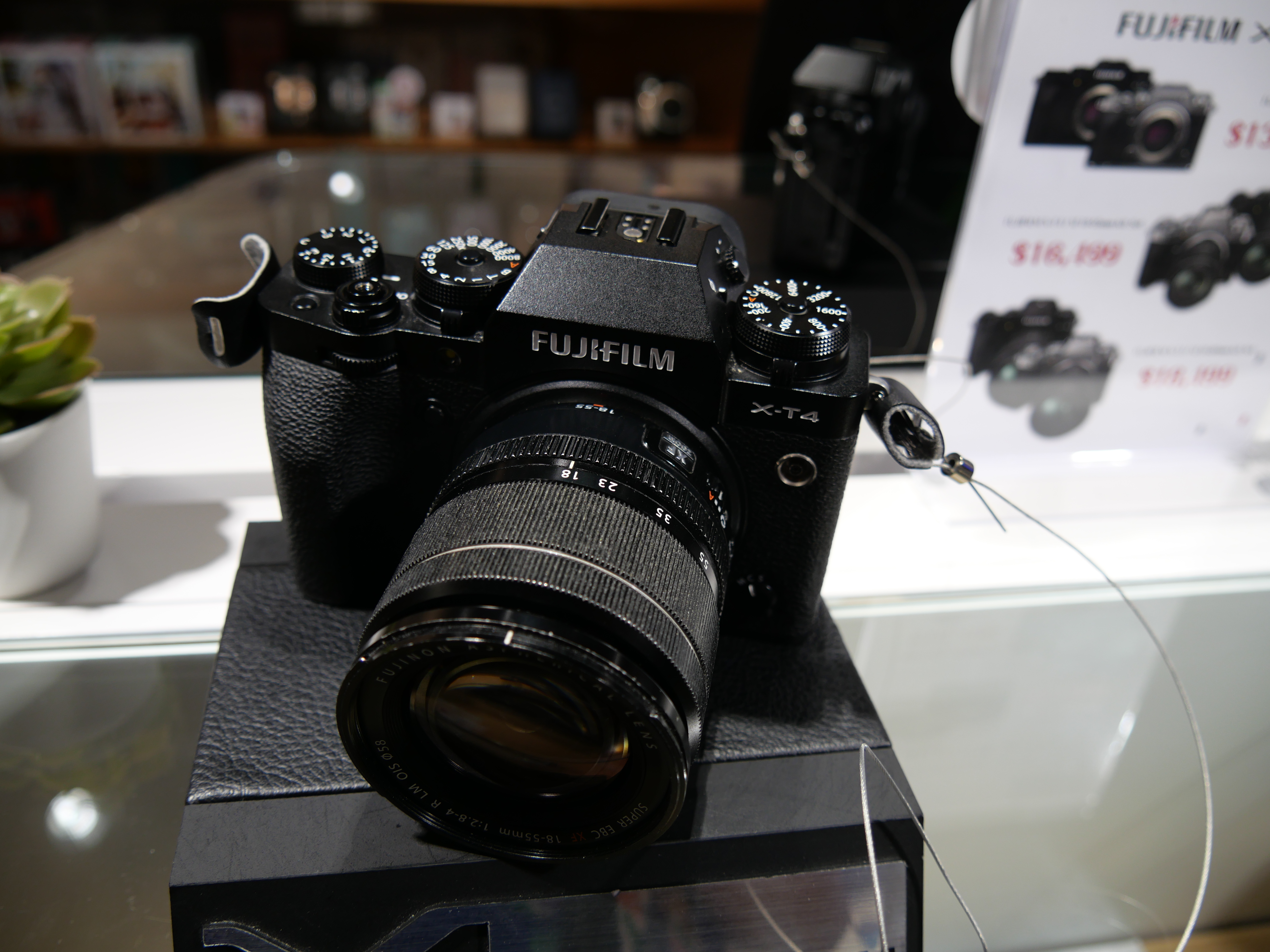

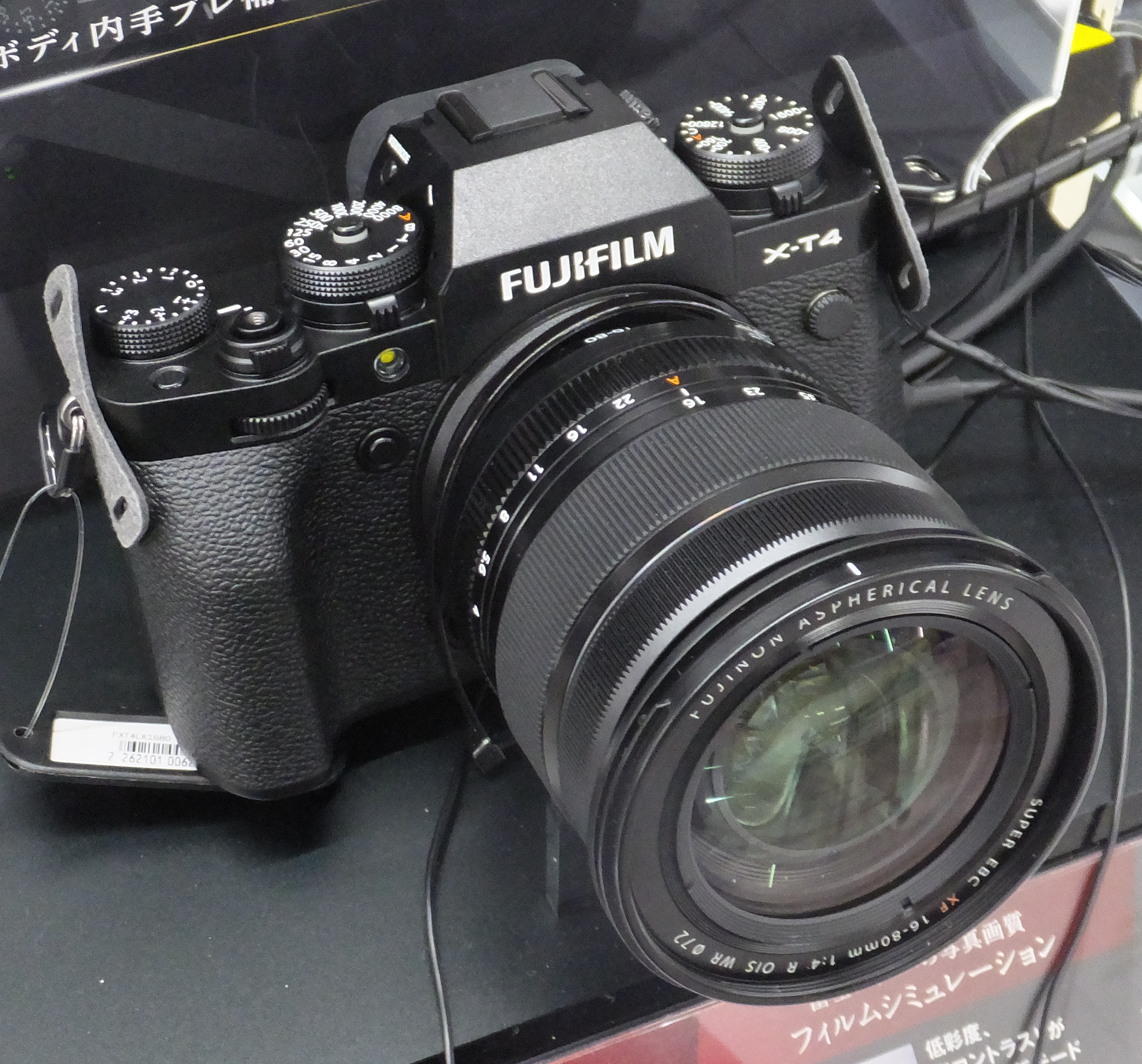

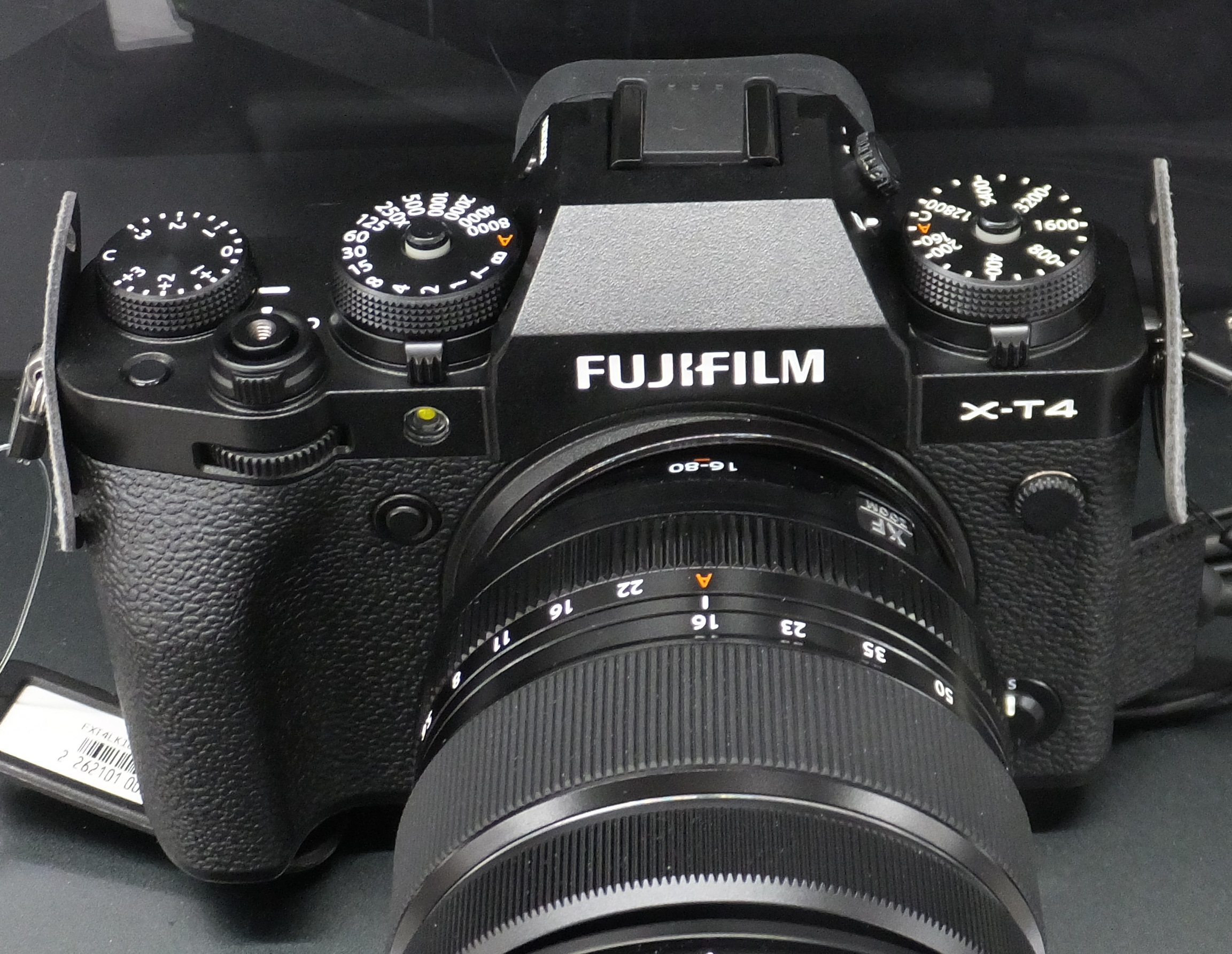

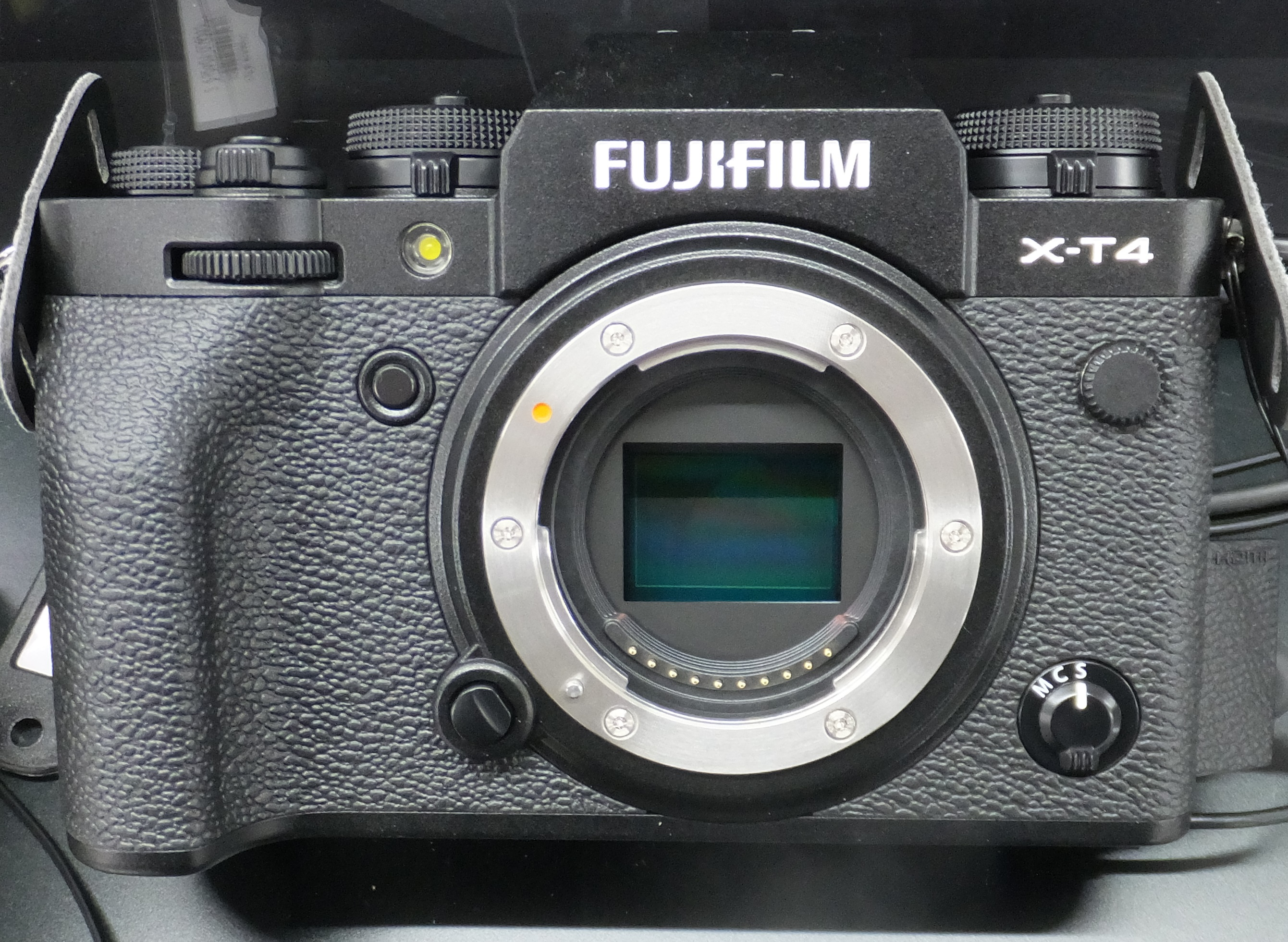

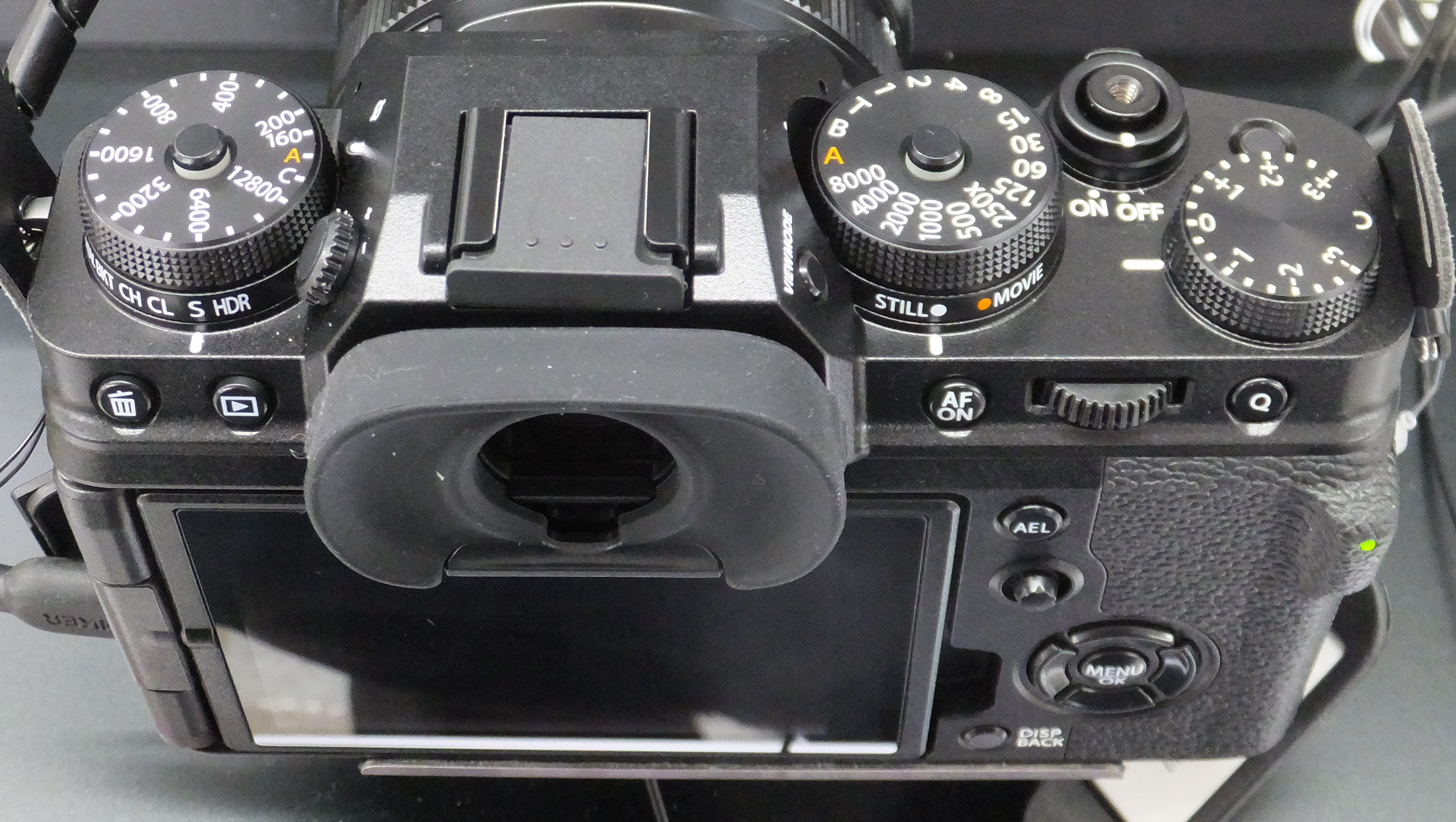

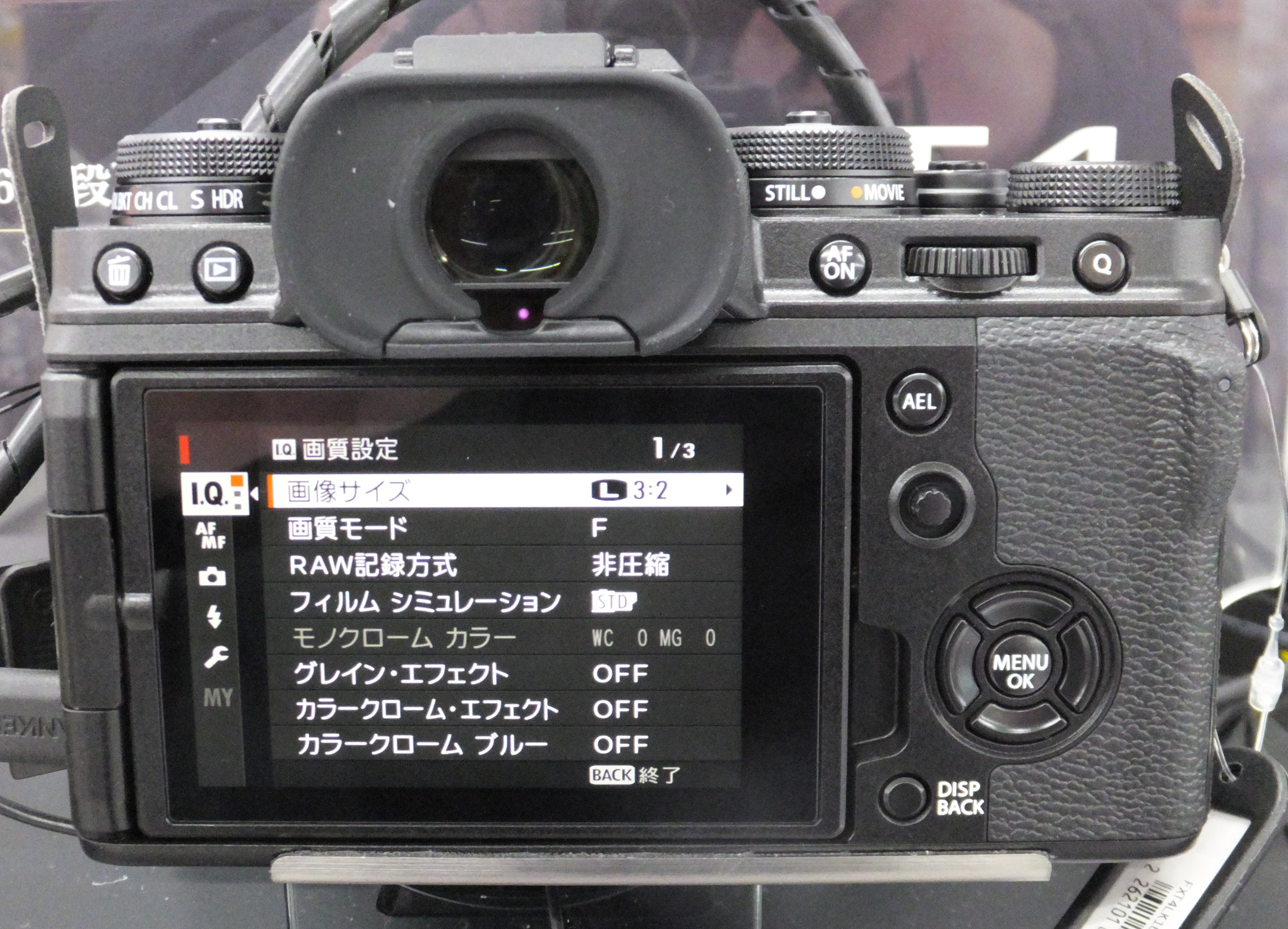

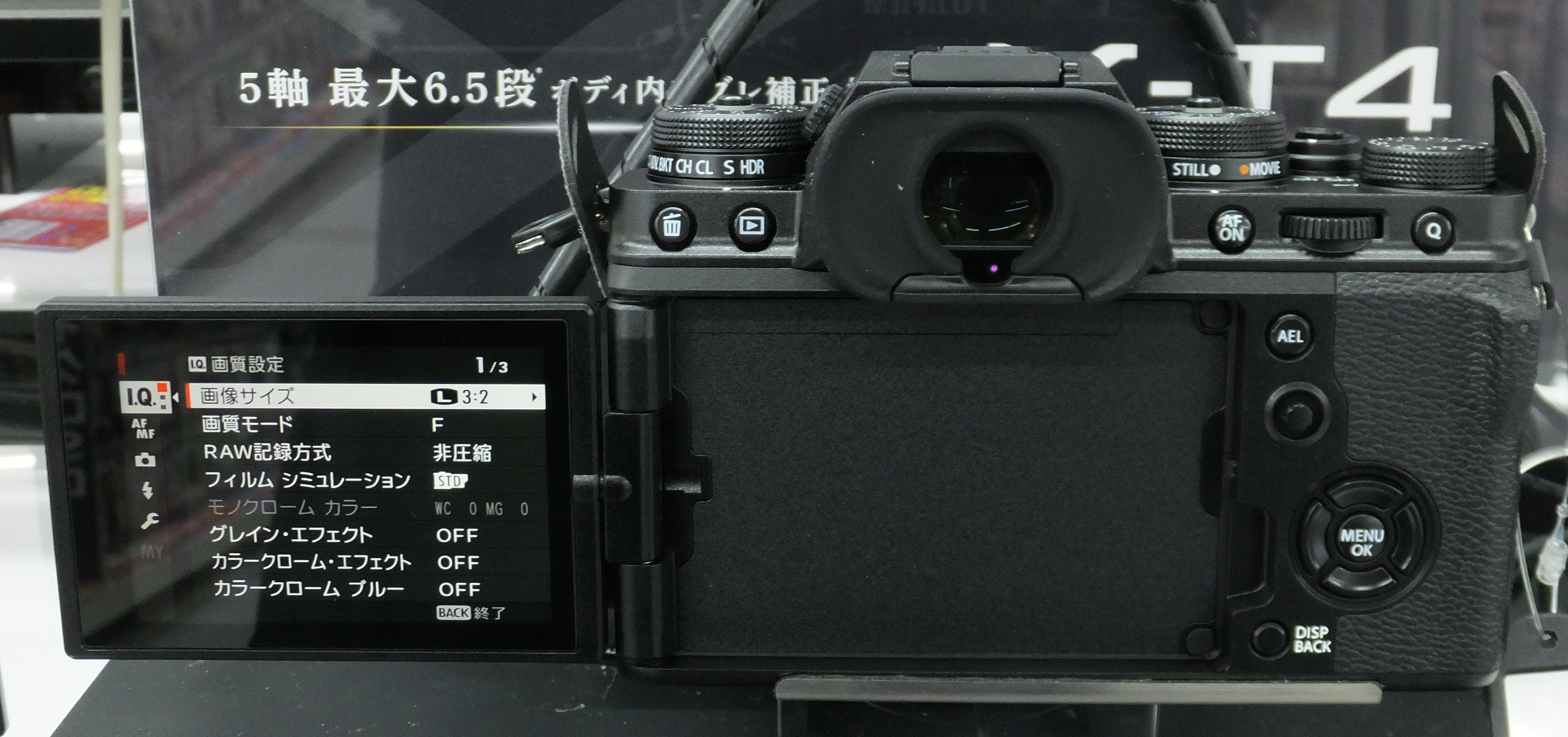

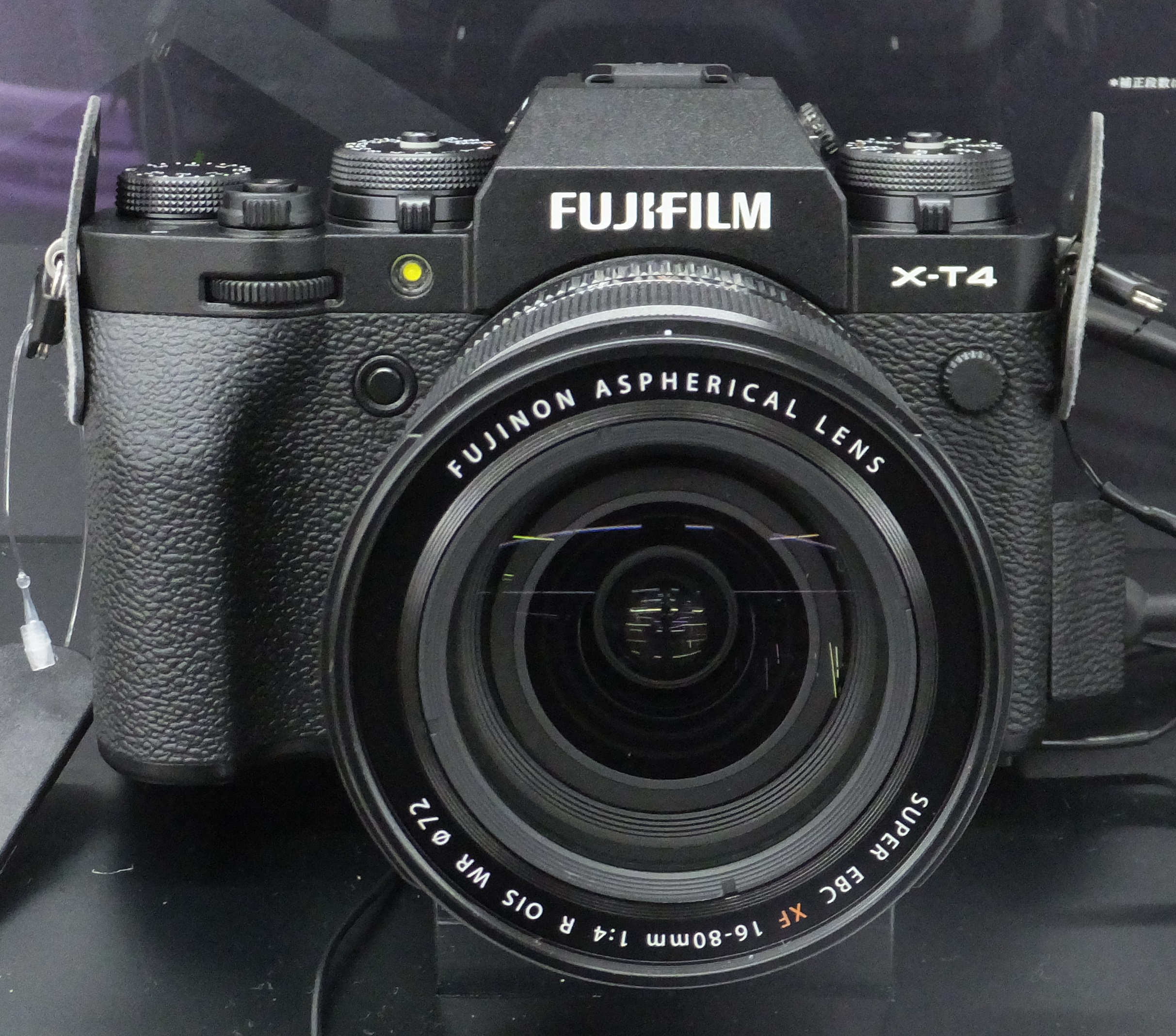

== See also ==
- List of retro-style digital cameras

Type	Lens	2011	2012	2013	2014	2015	2016	2017	2018	2019	2020	2021	2022	2023	2024	2025	2026
MILC	G-mount; Medium format sensor							GFX 50S ^{F} ^{T}					GFX 50S II ^{F} ^{T}				
MILC	G-mount; Medium format sensor									GFX 50R ^{F} ^{T}							
MILC	G-mount; Medium format sensor										GFX 100 ^{F} ^{T}					GFX 100 II ^{F} ^{T}	
MILC	G-mount; Medium format sensor											GFX 100 IR ^{F} ^{T}					
MILC	G-mount; Medium format sensor											GFX 100S ^{F} ^{T}				GFX 100S II ^{F} ^{T}	
MILC	G-mount; Medium format sensor															GFX Eterna 55 ^{F} ^{T}	
MILC	Prime lens Medium format sensor															GFX 100RF ^{F} ^{T}	
MILC	X-mount; APS-C sensor		X-Pro1				X-Pro2				X-Pro3 ^{f} ^{T}						
MILC	X-mount; APS-C sensor								X-H1 ^{F} ^{T}					X-H2 ^{A} ^{T}			
MILC	X-mount; APS-C sensor													X-H2S ^{A} ^{T}			
MILC	X-mount; APS-C sensor											X-S10 ^{A} ^{T}			X-S20 ^{A} ^{T}		
MILC	X-mount; APS-C sensor				X-T1 ^{f}			X-T2 ^{F}		X-T3 ^{F} ^{T}		X-T4 ^{A} ^{T}		X-T5 ^{F} ^{T}			
MILC	X-mount; APS-C sensor															X-T50 ^{f} ^{T}	
MILC	X-mount; APS-C sensor						X-T10 ^{f}	X-T20 ^{f} ^{T}		X-T30 ^{f} ^{T}			X-T30 II ^{f} ^{T}			X-T30 III ^{f} ^{T}	
MILC	X-mount; APS-C sensor									_{15} X-T100 ^{F} ^{T}	X-T200 ^{A} ^{T}						
MILC	X-mount; APS-C sensor			X-E1	X-E2		X-E2s		X-E3 ^{T}			X-E4 ^{f} ^{T}				X-E5 ^{f} ^{T}	
MILC	X-mount; APS-C sensor				X-M1 ^{f}											X-M5 ^{A} ^{T}	
MILC	X-mount; APS-C sensor				X-A1 ^{f}	X-A2 ^{f}		X-A3 ^{f} ^{T}	_{15} X-A5 ^{f} ^{T}		X-A7 ^{A} ^{T}						
MILC	X-mount; APS-C sensor							X-A10 ^{f}	X-A20 ^{f} ^{T}								
Compact	Prime lens APS-C sensor	X100		X100S		X100T		X100F			X100V ^{f} ^{T}				X100VI ^{f} ^{T}		
Compact	Prime lens APS-C sensor						X70 ^{f} ^{T}			XF10 ^{T}							
Compact	Prime lens 1" sensor															X half ^{T}	
Compact	Zoom lens^{2}/_{3}" sensor		X10	X20		X30 ^{f}											
Compact	Zoom lens^{2}/_{3}" sensor				XQ1	XQ2											
Compact	Zoom lens^{2}/_{3}" sensor			XF1													
Bridge	^{2}/_{3}" sensor		X-S1 ^{f}														
Type	Lens																
Type	Lens	2011	2012	2013	2014	2015	2016	2017	2018	2019	2020	2021	2022	2023	2024	2025	2026
