= Fujifilm X-T3 =

2018 APS-C mirrorless camera

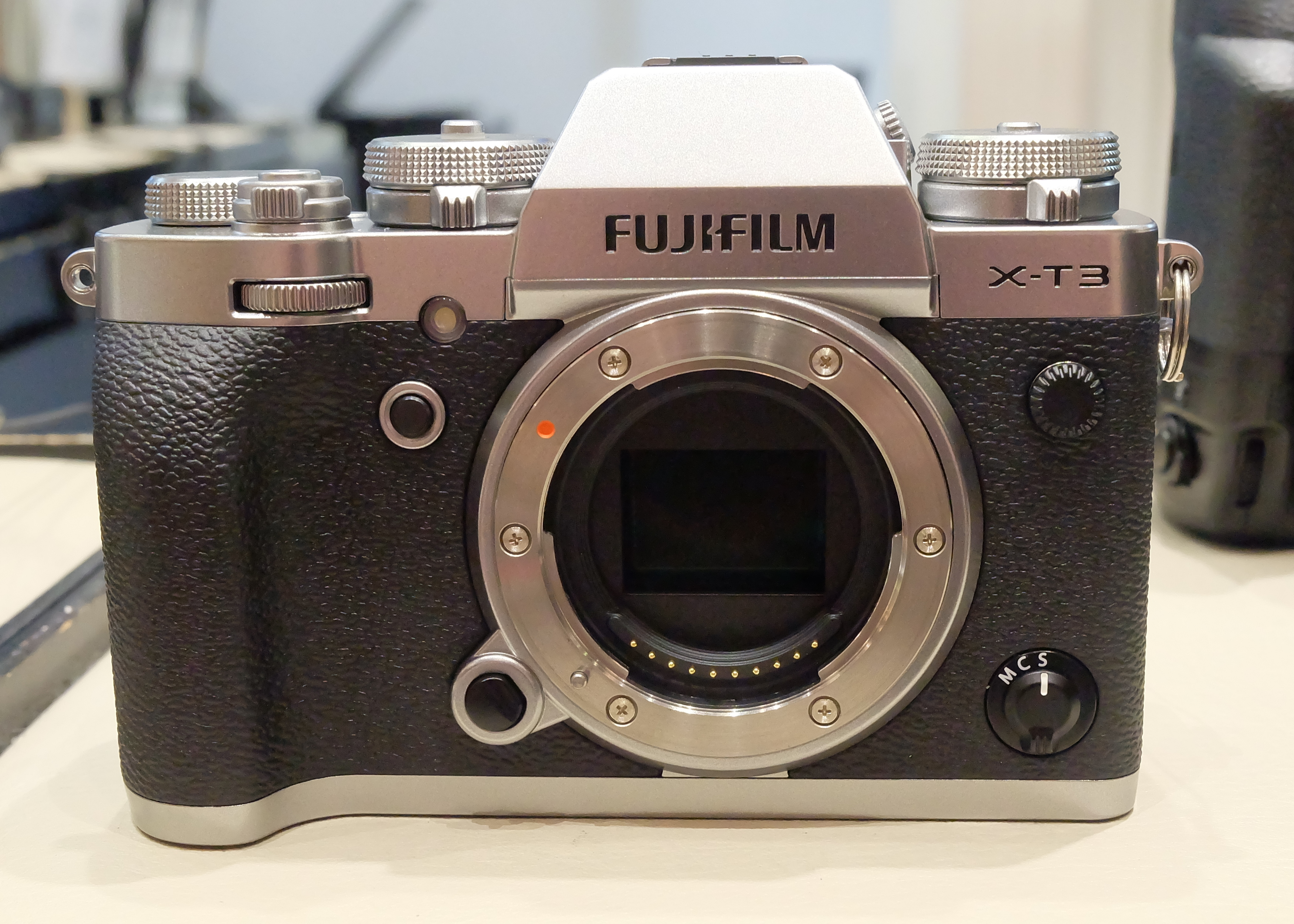
- Fujifilm X-T3 body (silver)

Overview
- Maker: Fujifilm
- Type: MILC
- Released: September 6, 2018; 7 years ago
- Intro price: X-T3: USD 1,499 (body), USD 1,899 (kit); X-T3 WW: USD 1,100 (body), USD 1,500 (kit)

Lens
- Lens mount: Fujifilm X
- Lens: Interchangeable lens
- Compatible lenses: Fujinon

Sensor/medium
- Sensor: APS-C
- Sensor type: X-Trans CMOS 4
- Sensor size: 23.5 mm × 15.6 mm
- Sensor maker: Sony
- Maximum resolution: 26.1 megapixels 6240 × 4160
- Film speed: 160–12800 (standard); 80–51200 (extend)
- Storage media: Dual Slot SD, SDHC, SDXC; V90, UHS-II, UHS-I

Focusing
- Focus: Intelligent Hybrid TTL contrast detection / Phase detection
- Focus modes: Single point, Zone, Wide/Tracking
- Focus areas: 91 focus point
- Focus bracketing: Auto, Manual

Exposure/metering
- Exposure: TTL 256-zone metering
- Exposure modes: Program AE, Aperture Priority AE, Shutter Speed Priority AE, Manual Exposure
- Exposure metering: Through-the-lens
- Metering modes: Multi, Spot, Average, Center Weighted

Flash
- Flash: External Flash
- Flash synchronization: 1/250 s
- Compatible flashes: EF-X8 Flash, Dedicated TTL Flash

Shutter
- Shutter: Focal Plane Shutter
- Shutter speeds: 4 s to 1/8000 s (mechanical), 4 s to 1/32000 s (electronic)
- Continuous shooting: 30.0 fps

Viewfinder
- Viewfinder: EVF with eye sensor
- Electronic viewfinder: 0.5" 3.69M dots OLED
- Viewfinder magnification: 0.75
- Frame coverage: 100%

Image processing
- Image processor: X-Processor 4
- White balance: Auto, Custom, Preset, Fluorescent, Incandescent, Underwater
- WB bracketing: ±1, ±2, ±3
- Dynamic range bracketing: AUTO, 100%, 200%, 400%

General
- Video recording: MOV; 4K up to 60 fps, 1080p up to 120 fps
- LCD screen: 3.0" 1.04M dots touchscreen variable-angle monitor
- Battery: NP-W126S Li-ion
- Optional battery packs: Battery Grip with 2 adaptable batteries
- AV port(s): HDMI D, ⌀3.5 mm & ⌀2.5 mm audio jack
- Data port: USB-C 3.1, Wi-Fi 4, Bluetooth 4.1
- Body features: Magnesium alloy body with a leather wrap
- Dimensions: 132.5 mm × 92.8 mm × 58.5 mm (5.22 in × 3.65 in × 2.30 in)
- Weight: 539 g (19 oz) (1.188 lb) including battery and memory card
- Made in: China

Chronology
- Predecessor: Fujifilm X-T2
- Successor: Fujifilm X-T4

The Fujifilm X-T3 is a mirrorless interchangeable-lens digital camera announced on September 6, 2018. It is weather-resistant, has a backside-illuminated X-Trans CMOS 4 APS-C sensor and an X-Processor 4 quad core processor. It is the successor to 2016's Fujifilm X-T2. It uses the Fujifilm X-mount.

The X-T3 is capable of recording video in 4K resolution up to 60 fps. The X-T3 is intended to be sold new either as the camera body only, or with the 18-55 mm lens. The camera is available in 2 colors, black and silver and is styled after an SLR camera.

The X-T4, which was announced on February 26, 2020, is the successor to the X-T3. However, the X-T3 continued to be offered even after the X-T4 was introduced. On September 2, 2021, Fujifilm announced X-T3 WW (worldwide) which simplifies supply chains and can be sold at a lower price since a battery charger is not included.

== Key features ==
The X-T3 is a mirrorless compact camera made by Fujifilm. It measures 132.5 mm × 92.8 mm × 58.8 mm and weighs 539 g including memory card and battery.

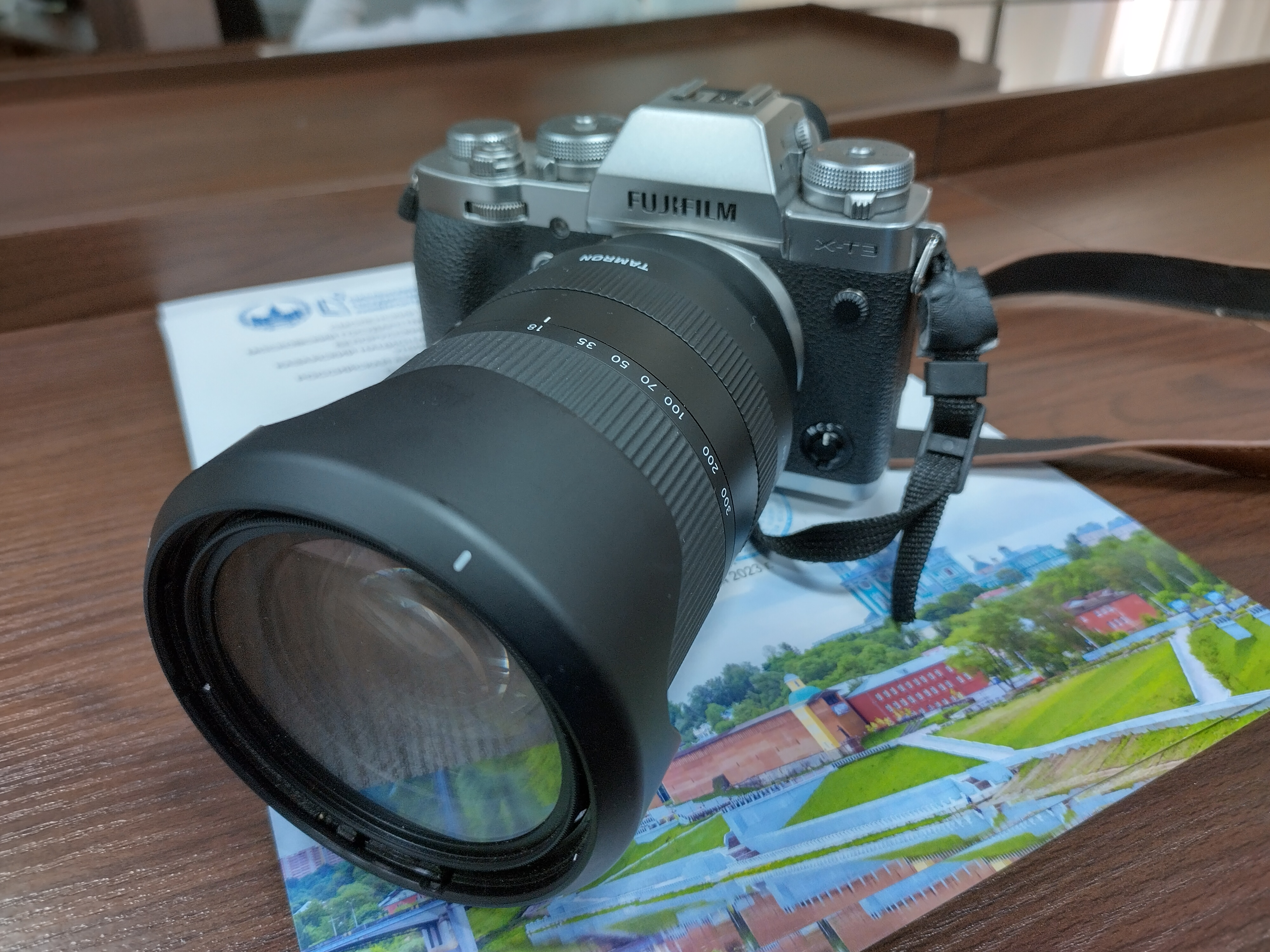
The lens Tamron 18-300 3.5-6.3 DiIII-AVC VXD Fujifilm X APS-C with Fujifilm XT 3 camera

Mechanical dials are provided for key operations, including shutter speed, ISO sensitivity, exposure compensation, drive modes and metering modes. It lacks built-in flash, but includes a flash unit.

- 26.1 megapixels X-Trans CMOS IV sensor.
- Weather resistant structure
- X-Processor 4, a quad-core CPU.
- 23.5 mm × 15.6 mm CMOS sensor (APS-C) Fujifilm X-Trans sensor.
- Touch screen with 3-way tilt
- Selectable film simulations
- 425-point hybrid AF system
- 30 fps shooting in 1.25× crop 'Sports Finder' mode
- 60 fps shooting in 1.18× crop in 4K
- Pre-Shot ES
- Hybrid autofocus
- New Phase detection AF to entire frame
- Up to 30 fps black-out free high-speed continuous shooting
- 4K video up to 60fps 10 bit recording
- 4K Burst, 4K Multi Focus
- Headphone and Microphone sockets
- USB-C which can be used for charging battery
- WiFi connectivity for connection and tagging via a smartphone
- Bluetooth connectivity for connection and tagging via a smartphone
- Dual UHS-II SD card slot
- Available in silver and black
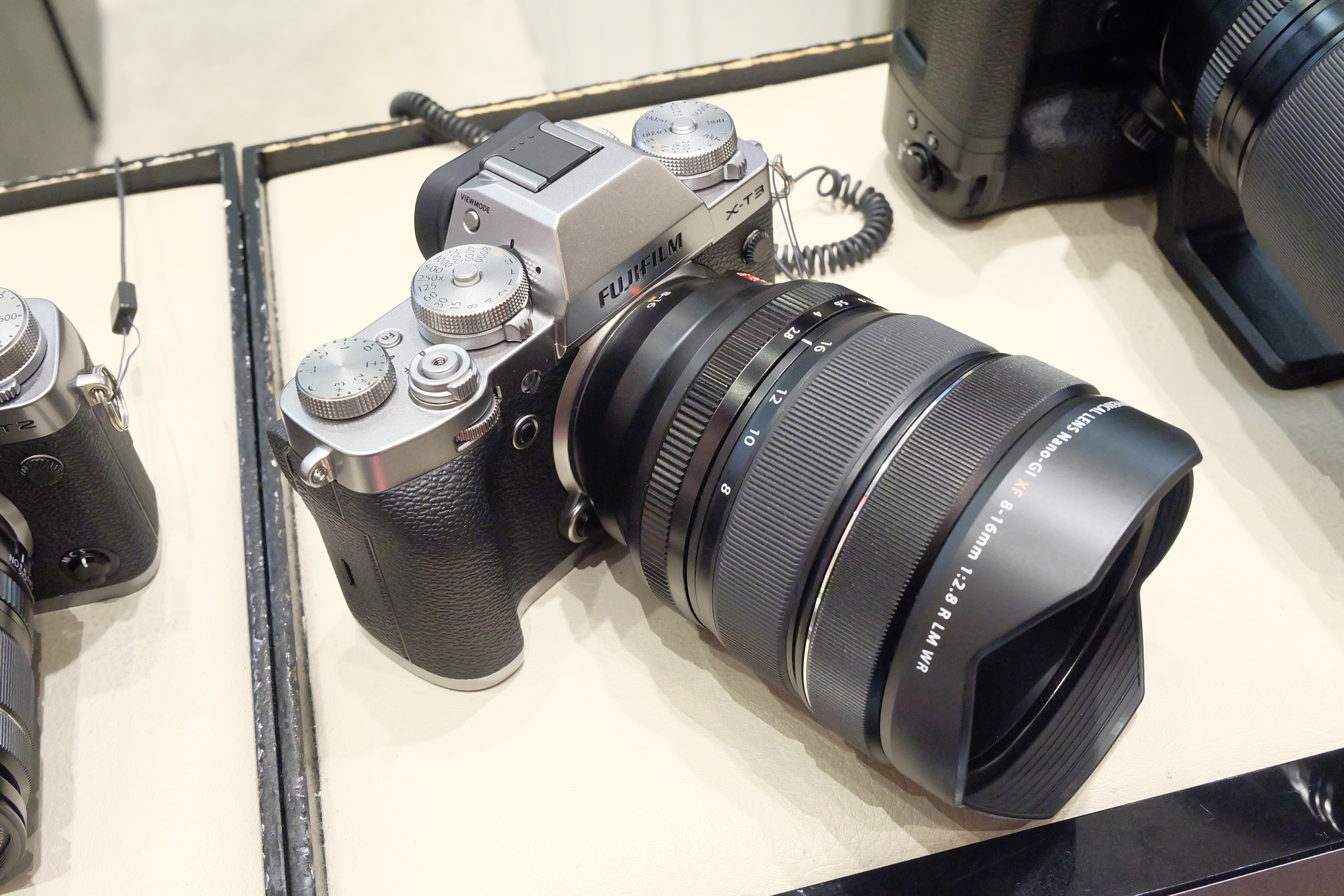

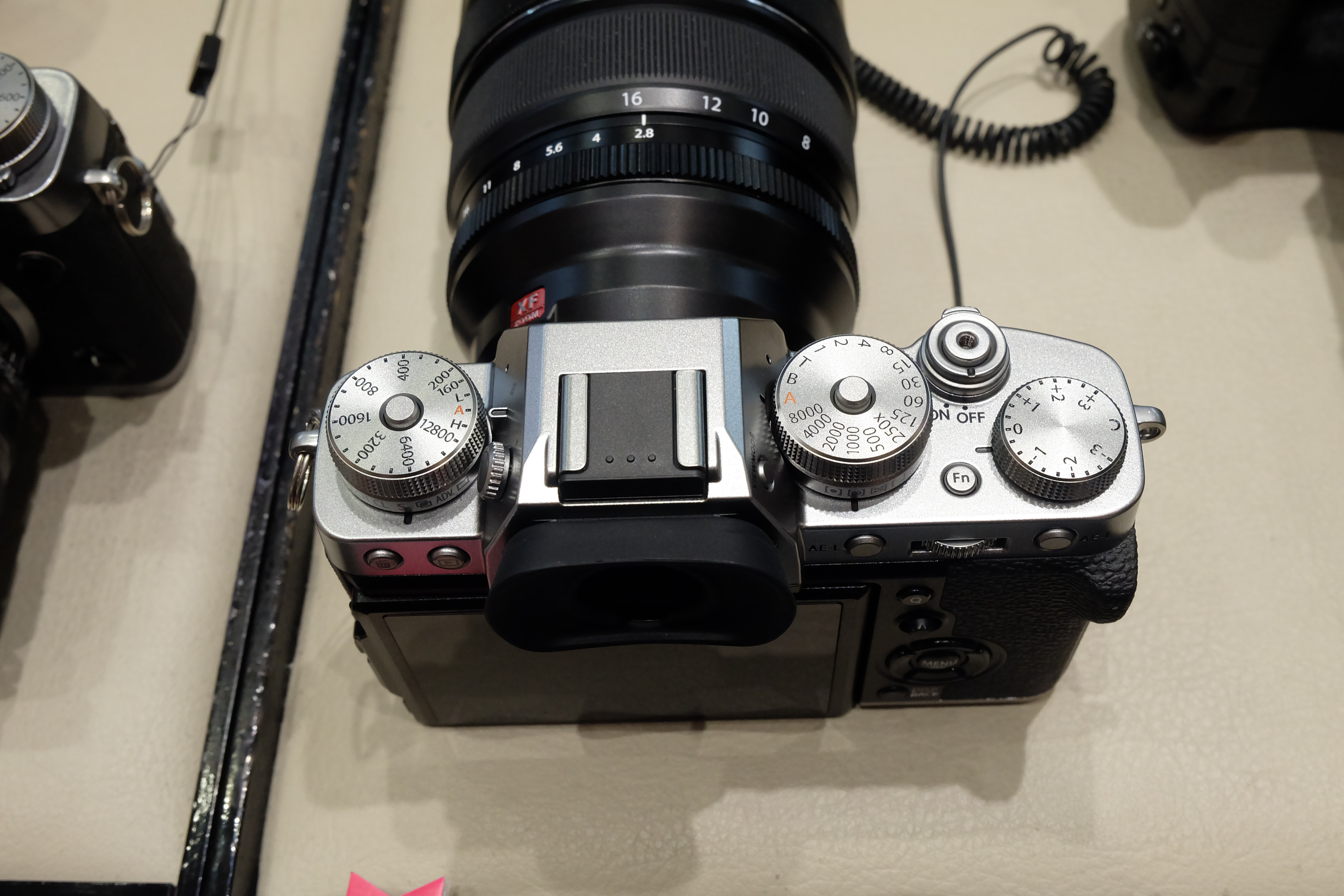

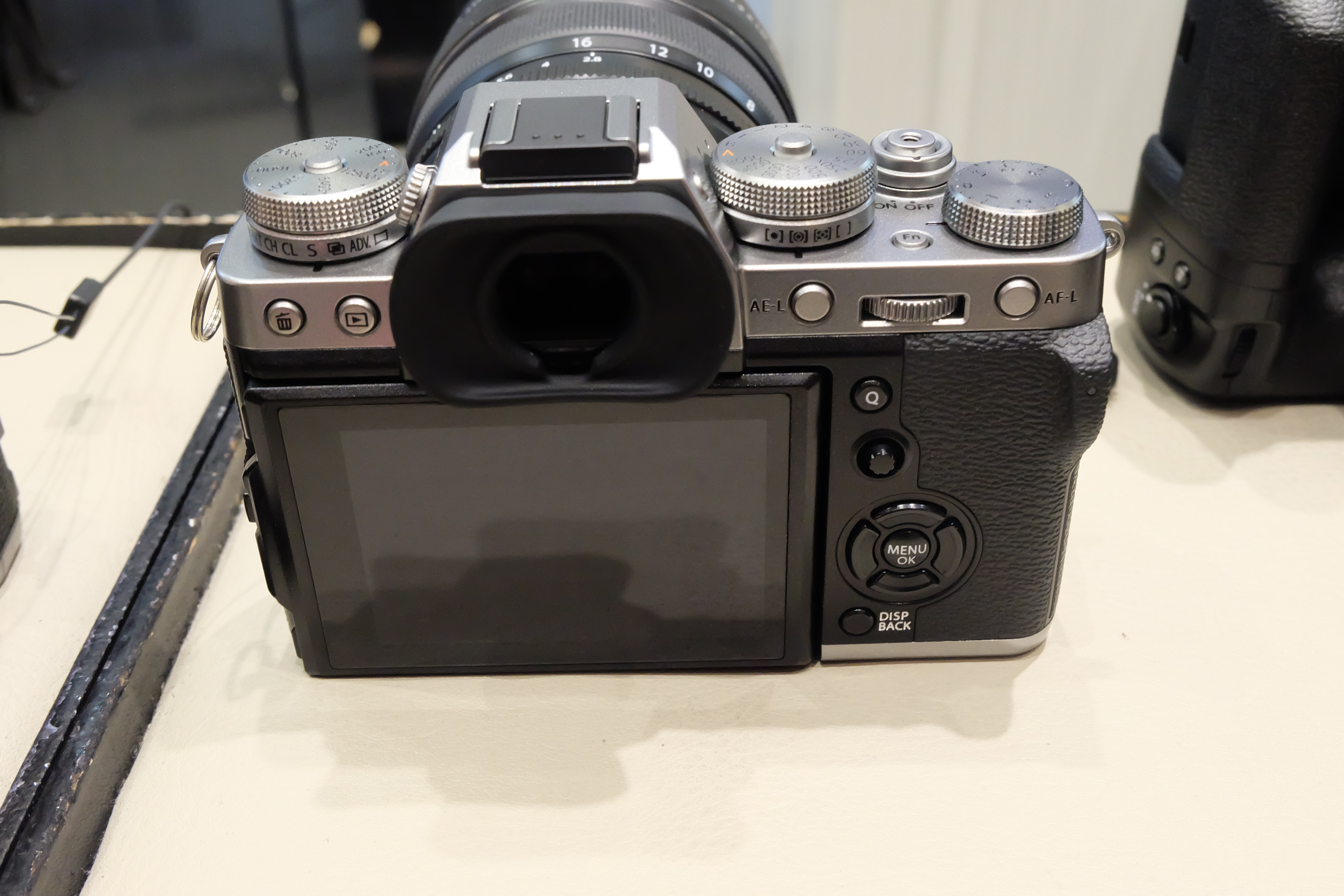

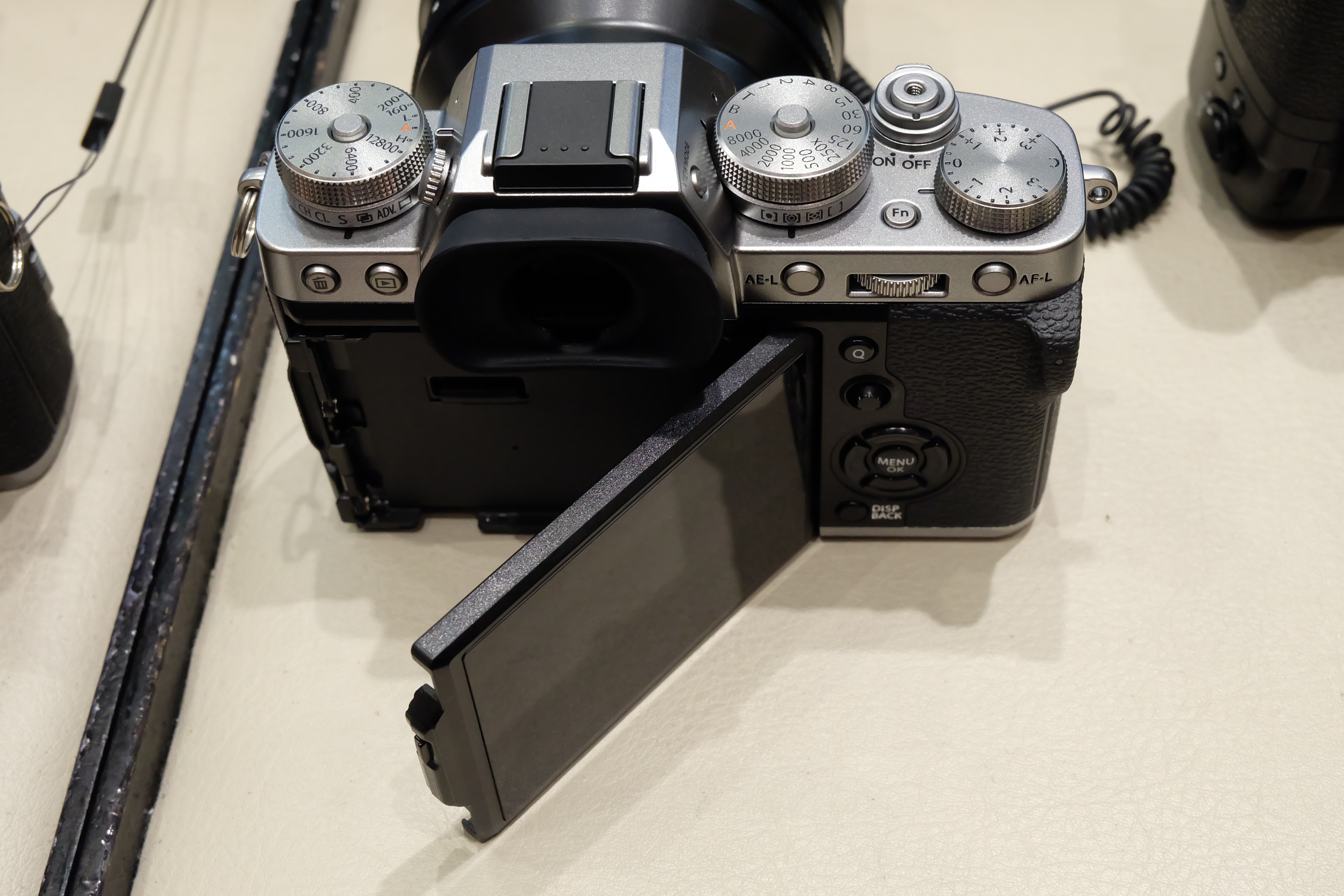

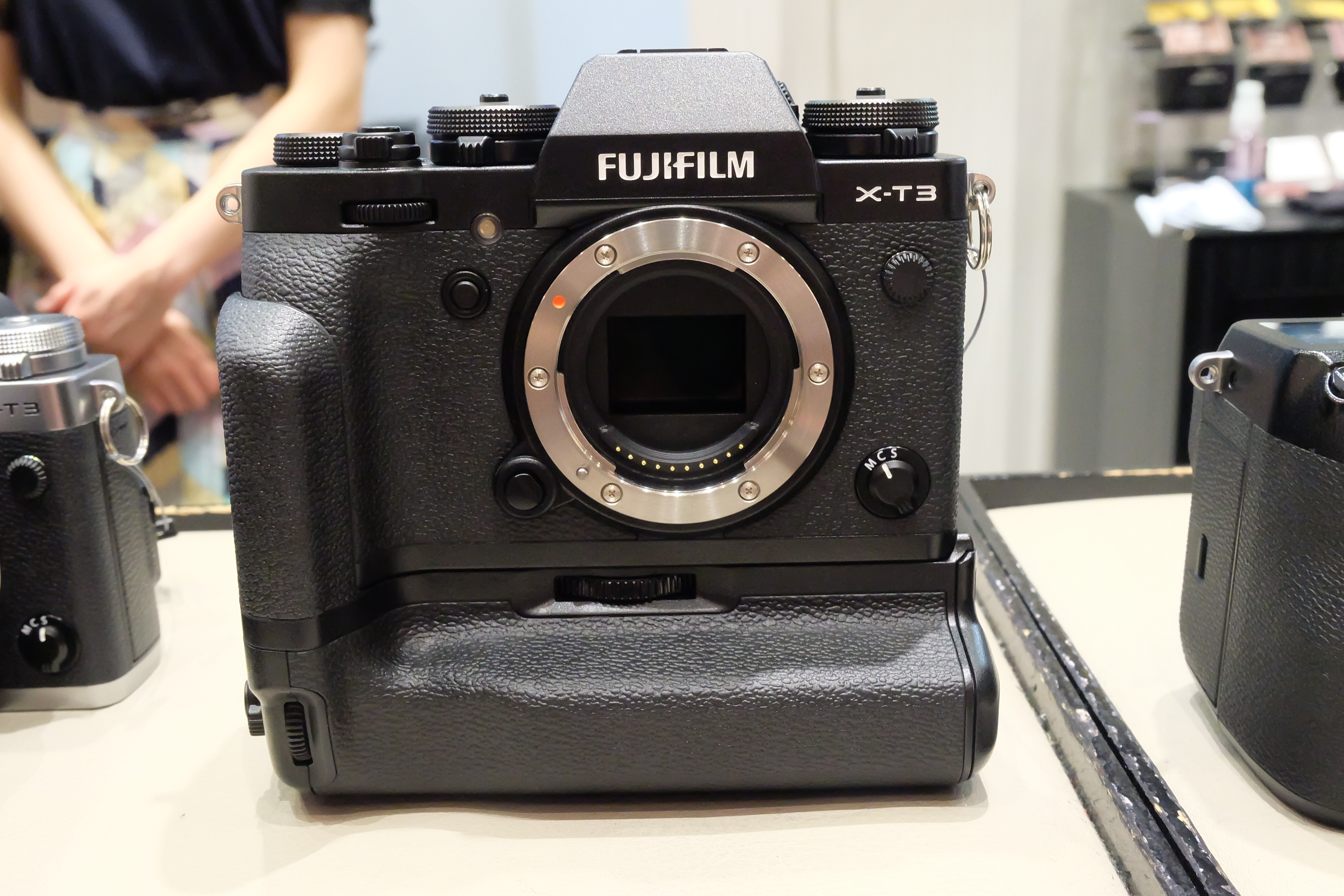

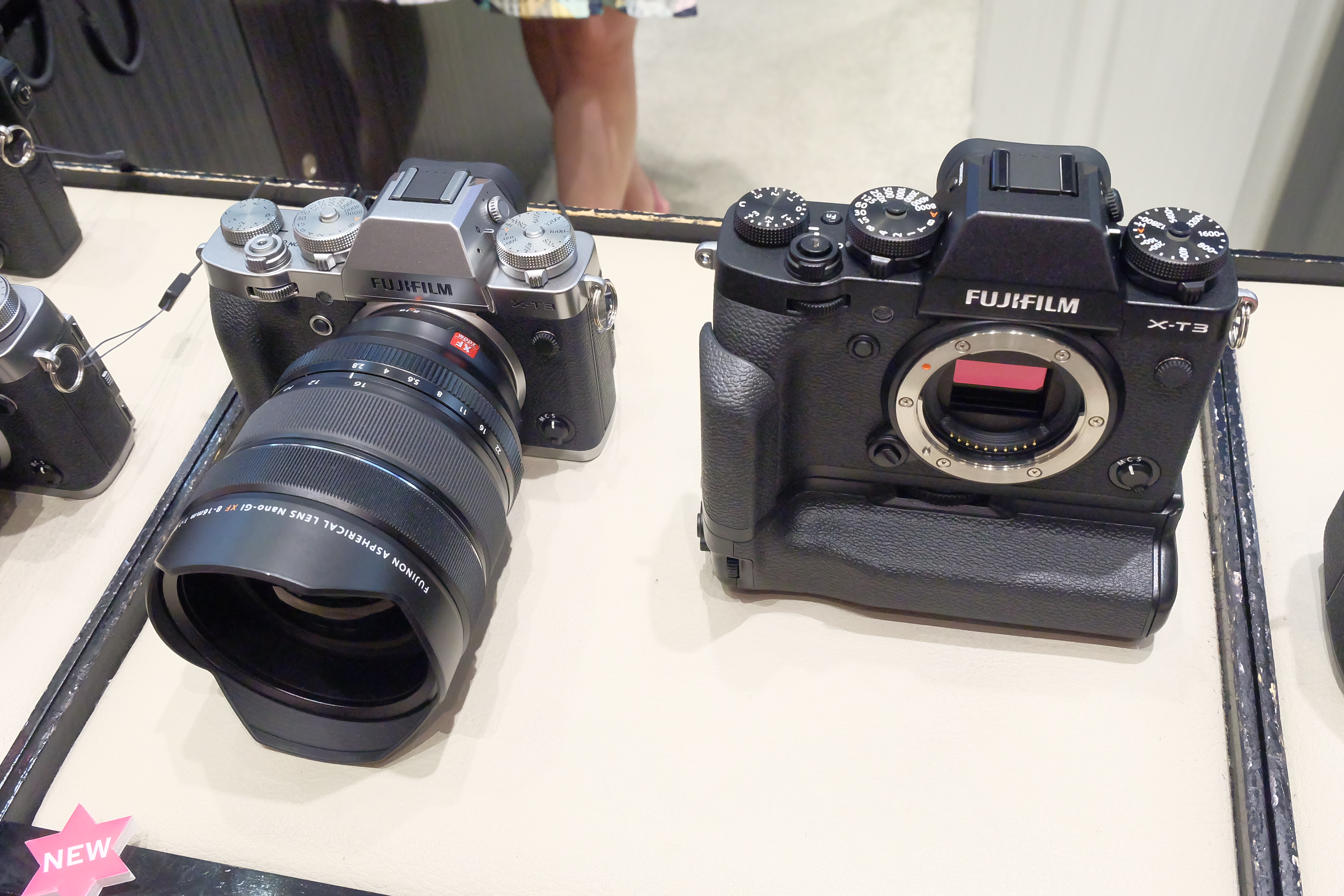

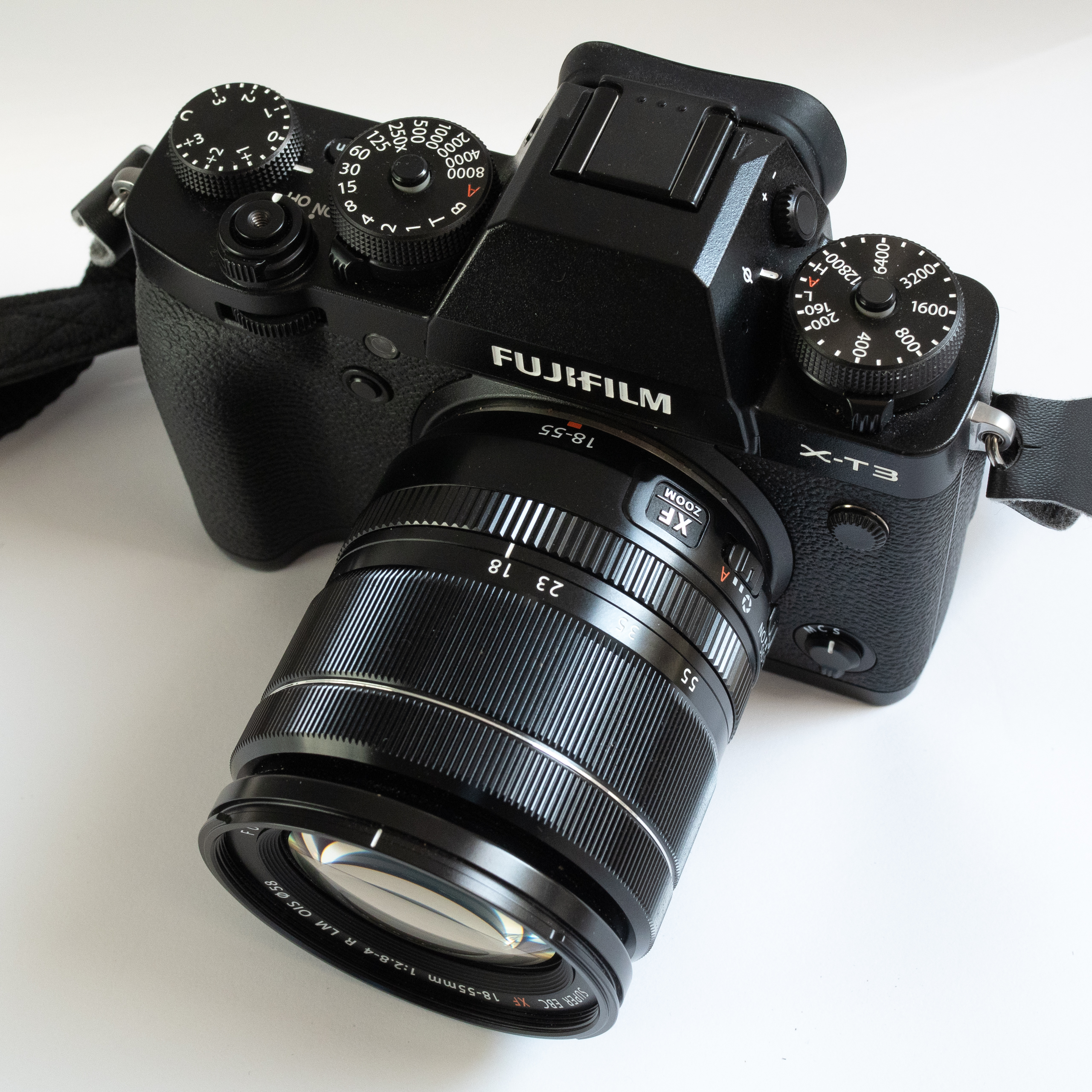

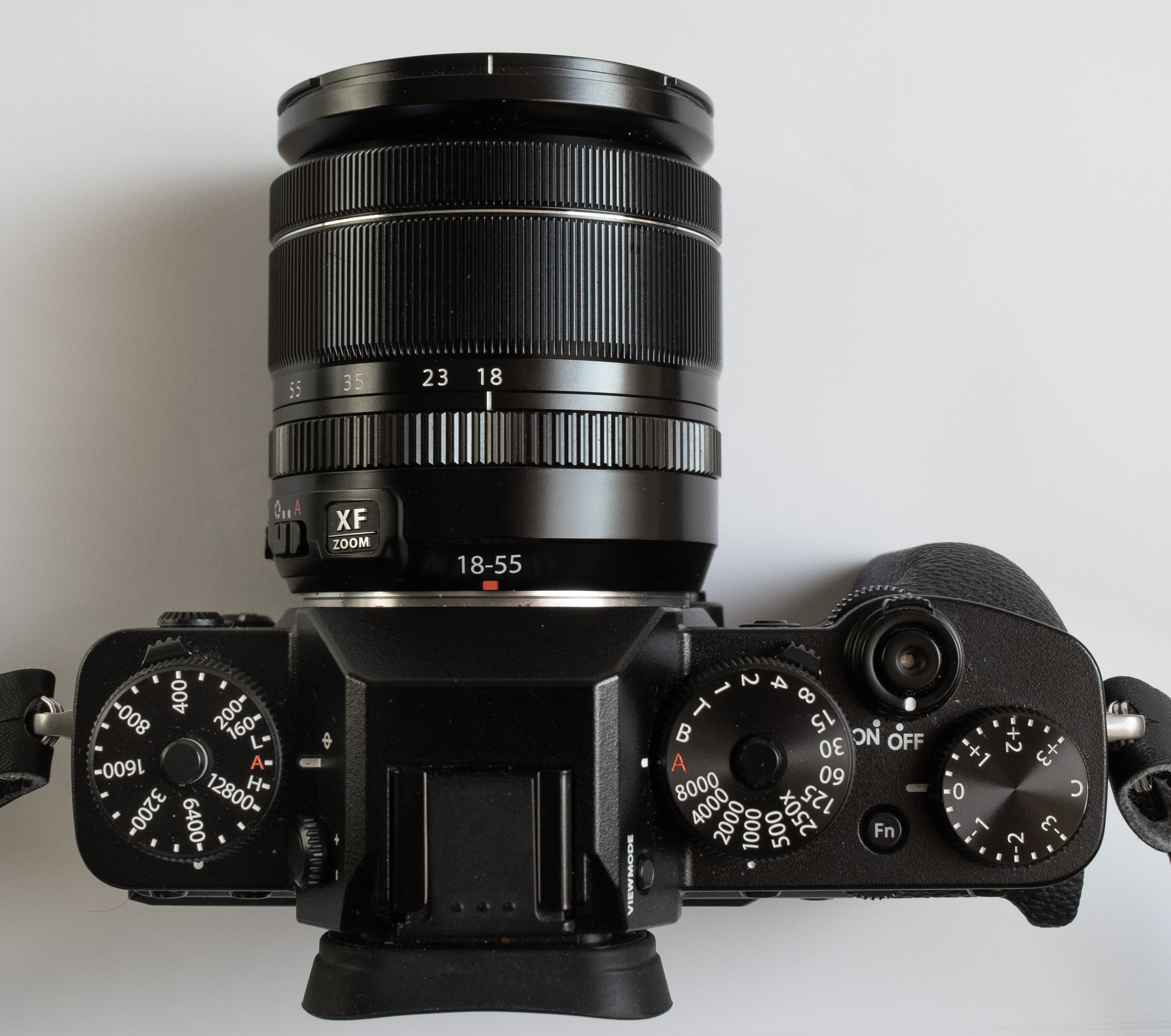

== Included accessories ==
- Li-ion battery NP-W126S
- Battery charger BC-W126S
- Shoe-mount flash unit EF-X8

== See also ==
- List of retro-style digital cameras

Type	Lens	2011	2012	2013	2014	2015	2016	2017	2018	2019	2020	2021	2022	2023	2024	2025	2026
MILC	G-mount; Medium format sensor							GFX 50S ^{F} ^{T}					GFX 50S II ^{F} ^{T}				
MILC	G-mount; Medium format sensor									GFX 50R ^{F} ^{T}							
MILC	G-mount; Medium format sensor										GFX 100 ^{F} ^{T}					GFX 100 II ^{F} ^{T}	
MILC	G-mount; Medium format sensor											GFX 100 IR ^{F} ^{T}					
MILC	G-mount; Medium format sensor											GFX 100S ^{F} ^{T}				GFX 100S II ^{F} ^{T}	
MILC	G-mount; Medium format sensor															GFX Eterna 55 ^{F} ^{T}	
MILC	Prime lens Medium format sensor															GFX 100RF ^{F} ^{T}	
MILC	X-mount; APS-C sensor		X-Pro1				X-Pro2				X-Pro3 ^{f} ^{T}						
MILC	X-mount; APS-C sensor								X-H1 ^{F} ^{T}					X-H2 ^{A} ^{T}			
MILC	X-mount; APS-C sensor													X-H2S ^{A} ^{T}			
MILC	X-mount; APS-C sensor											X-S10 ^{A} ^{T}			X-S20 ^{A} ^{T}		
MILC	X-mount; APS-C sensor				X-T1 ^{f}			X-T2 ^{F}		X-T3 ^{F} ^{T}		X-T4 ^{A} ^{T}		X-T5 ^{F} ^{T}			
MILC	X-mount; APS-C sensor															X-T50 ^{f} ^{T}	
MILC	X-mount; APS-C sensor						X-T10 ^{f}	X-T20 ^{f} ^{T}		X-T30 ^{f} ^{T}			X-T30 II ^{f} ^{T}			X-T30 III ^{f} ^{T}	
MILC	X-mount; APS-C sensor									_{15} X-T100 ^{F} ^{T}	X-T200 ^{A} ^{T}						
MILC	X-mount; APS-C sensor			X-E1	X-E2		X-E2s		X-E3 ^{T}			X-E4 ^{f} ^{T}				X-E5 ^{f} ^{T}	
MILC	X-mount; APS-C sensor				X-M1 ^{f}											X-M5 ^{A} ^{T}	
MILC	X-mount; APS-C sensor				X-A1 ^{f}	X-A2 ^{f}		X-A3 ^{f} ^{T}	_{15} X-A5 ^{f} ^{T}		X-A7 ^{A} ^{T}						
MILC	X-mount; APS-C sensor							X-A10 ^{f}	X-A20 ^{f} ^{T}								
Compact	Prime lens APS-C sensor	X100		X100S		X100T		X100F			X100V ^{f} ^{T}				X100VI ^{f} ^{T}		
Compact	Prime lens APS-C sensor						X70 ^{f} ^{T}			XF10 ^{T}							
Compact	Prime lens 1" sensor															X half ^{T}	
Compact	Zoom lens^{2}/_{3}" sensor		X10	X20		X30 ^{f}											
Compact	Zoom lens^{2}/_{3}" sensor				XQ1	XQ2											
Compact	Zoom lens^{2}/_{3}" sensor			XF1													
Bridge	^{2}/_{3}" sensor		X-S1 ^{f}														
Type	Lens																
Type	Lens	2011	2012	2013	2014	2015	2016	2017	2018	2019	2020	2021	2022	2023	2024	2025	2026
