= Fujifilm X-T2 =

Digital camera

FUJIFILM X-T2
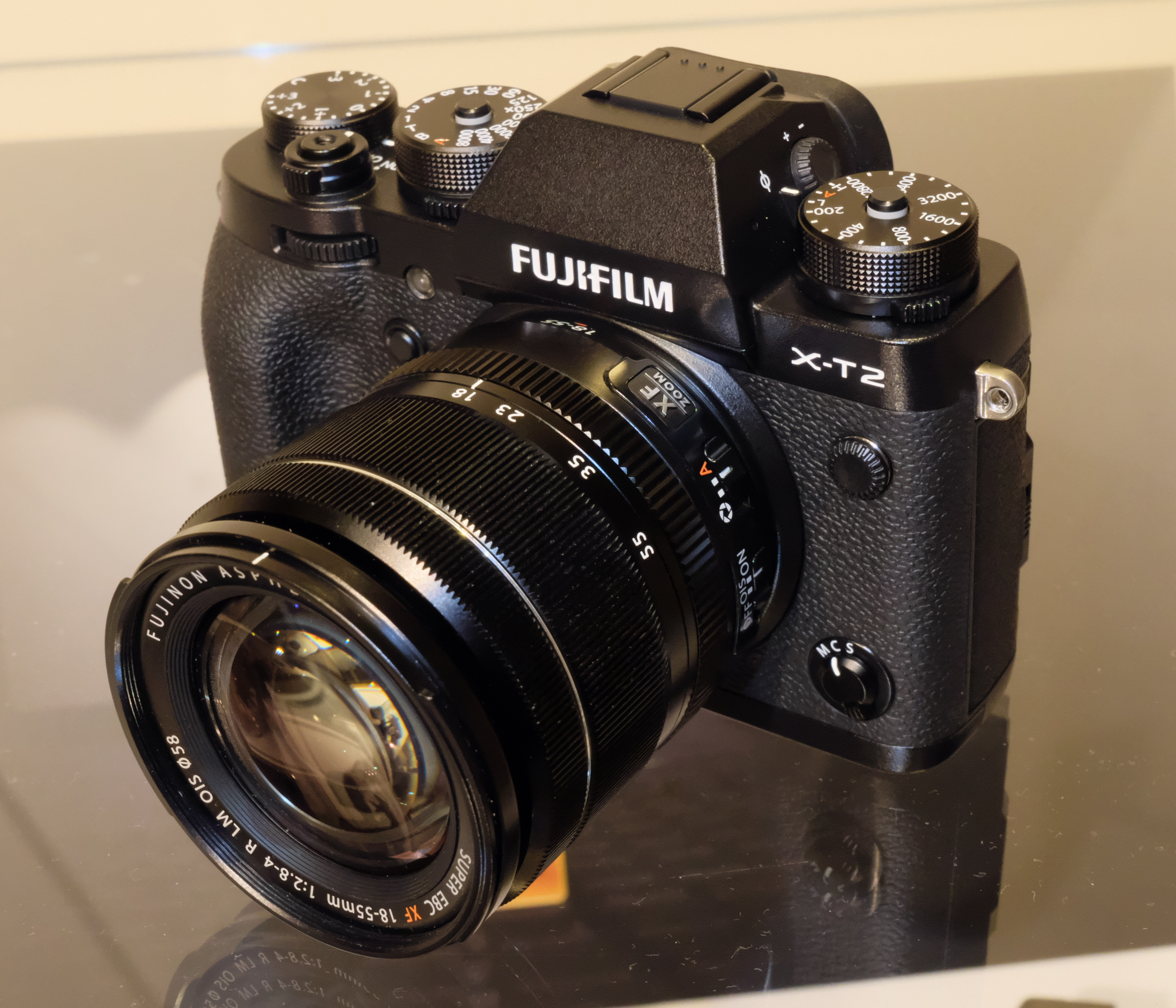
- X-T2 + XF 18-55mm R LM OIS

Overview
- Maker: Fujifilm
- Type: MILC
- Released: 7 July 2016
- Intro price: USD 1,599 (body), USD 1,899 (kit)

Lens
- Lens mount: Fujifilm X
- Lens: Interchangeable lens

Sensor/medium
- Sensor type: X-Trans CMOS III
- Sensor size: 23.6 mm × 15.6 mm (APS-C)
- Sensor maker: Sony
- Maximum resolution: 6000*4000 (24.3 megapixels)
- Film speed: 200–12800 (standard); 100–51200 (extend)
- Recording medium: SD, SDHC, SDXC (UHS-II)
- Storage media: SD Card (UHS-II), dual slot

Focusing
- Focus: Intelligent Hybrid TTL contrast detection / Phase detection
- Focus modes: Single point, Zone, Wide/Tracking
- Focus areas: 91 focus point

Exposure/metering
- Exposure: TTL 256 Split photometry
- Exposure bracketing: AE Bracketing
- Exposure modes: Program, Aperture Priority, Shutter Speed Priority, Manual Exposure
- Metering modes: Multi, Spot, Average, Center Weighted

Flash
- Flash: External
- Compatible flashes: EF-X8 Shoe Mount Flash

Shutter
- Shutter: Longitudinal Focal Plane Shutter (electromagnetic controlled)
- Shutter speeds: 30 s to 1/8000 s (mechanical), 30 s to 1/32000 s (electronic)
- Continuous shooting: 14 frames per second

Viewfinder
- Viewfinder: EVF with eye sensor
- Viewfinder magnification: 0.77
- Frame coverage: 100%

Image processing
- White balance: Yes
- WB bracketing: Yes
- Dynamic range bracketing: Yes

General
- Video recording: 4K up to 30 fps, 1080p up to 60 fps
- LCD screen: variable-angle 3.0 inches 1,040,000 dots
- Battery: NP-W126 Li-ion
- AV port(s): 3.5 mm and 2.5 mm audio jack, HDMI D
- Data port(s): USB 3.1, Wi-Fi 4
- Dimensions: 132.5 mm × 91.8 mm × 49.2 mm (5.22 in × 3.61 in × 1.94 in)
- Weight: 507 g (18 oz) (1.118 lb) including battery and memory card
- Made in: Japan

Chronology
- Predecessor: Fujifilm X-T1
- Successor: Fujifilm X-T3

The Fujifilm X-T2 is a DSLR-style mirrorless camera announced by Fujifilm on July 7, 2016. It uses the Fujifilm X-mount and is a successor to the Fujifilm X-T1. Sales of the camera began on September 8, 2016.

A Graphite Silver edition was released in February 2017.

The X-T3 succeeds the X-T2. The new camera was announced on September 6, 2018.

== Precise operation ==
Mechanical dials are provided for important operations, including shutter speed, ISO sensitivity, exposure compensation, drive modes and metering modes. For the prevention of operation errors, the dials for shutter speed and ISO sensitivity are equipped with a Lock & Release button, and are designed with extra height for operability improvement over the Fujifilm X-T1.

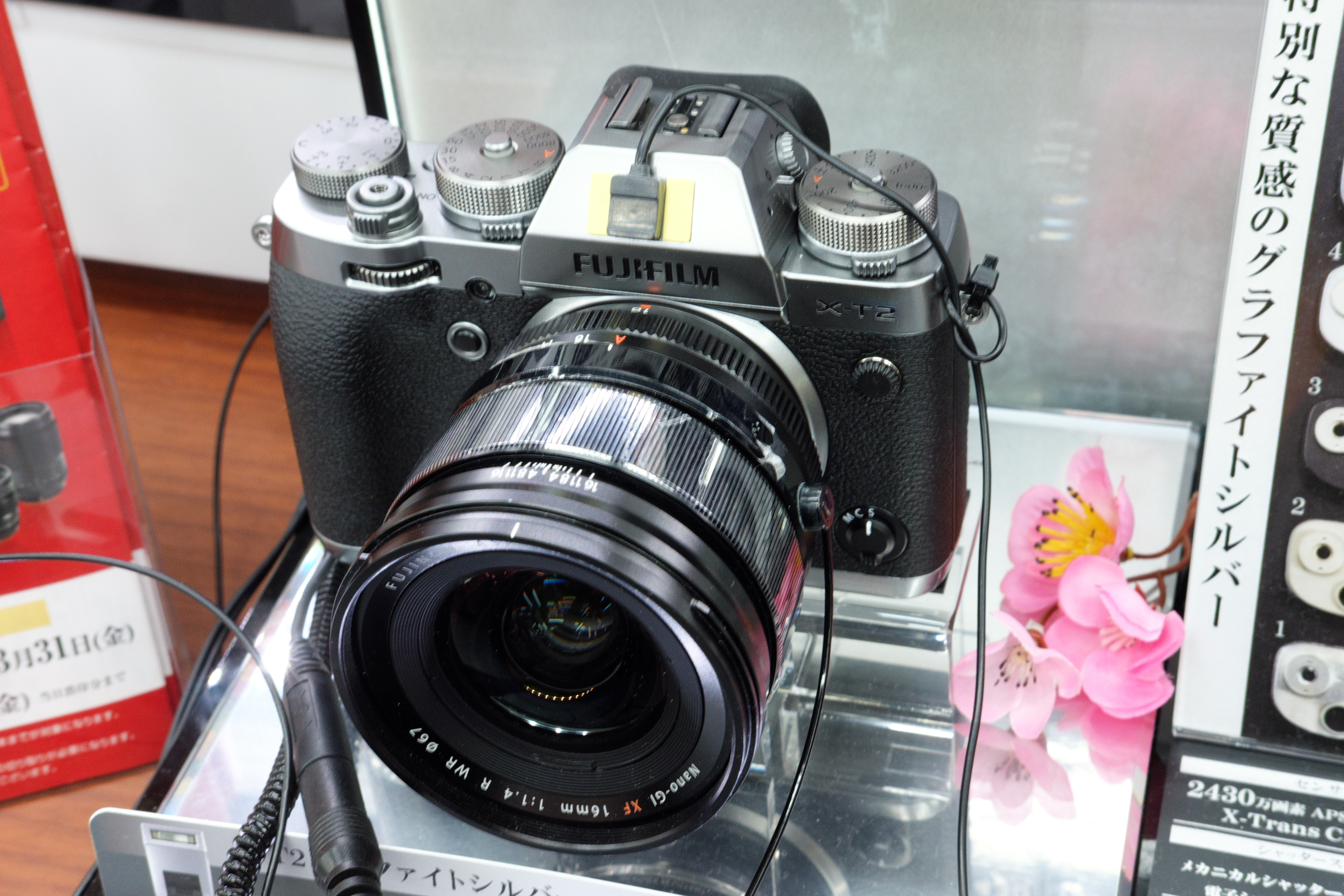
X-T2 Graphite Silver Edition

== See also ==
- List of retro-style digital cameras

Type	Lens	2011	2012	2013	2014	2015	2016	2017	2018	2019	2020	2021	2022	2023	2024	2025
MILC	G-mount; Medium format sensor							GFX 50S ^{F} ^{T}					GFX 50S II ^{F} ^{T}			
MILC	G-mount; Medium format sensor									GFX 50R ^{F} ^{T}						
MILC	G-mount; Medium format sensor										GFX 100 ^{F} ^{T}					GFX 100 II ^{F} ^{T}
MILC	G-mount; Medium format sensor											GFX 100 IR ^{F} ^{T}				
MILC	G-mount; Medium format sensor											GFX 100S ^{F} ^{T}				GFX 100S II^{F} ^{T}
MILC	G-mount; Medium format sensor															GFX Eterna 55^{F} ^{T}
MILC	Prime lens Medium format sensor															GFX 100RF ^{F} ^{T}
MILC	X-mount; APS-C sensor		X-Pro1				X-Pro2				X-Pro3 ^{f} ^{T}					
MILC	X-mount; APS-C sensor								X-H1 ^{F} ^{T}					X-H2 ^{A} ^{T}		
MILC	X-mount; APS-C sensor													X-H2S ^{A} ^{T}		
MILC	X-mount; APS-C sensor											X-S10 ^{A} ^{T}			X-S20 ^{A} ^{T}	
MILC	X-mount; APS-C sensor				X-T1 ^{f}			X-T2 ^{F}		X-T3 ^{F} ^{T}		X-T4 ^{A} ^{T}		X-T5 ^{F} ^{T}		
MILC	X-mount; APS-C sensor						X-T10 ^{f}	X-T20 ^{f} ^{T}		X-T30 ^{f} ^{T}			X-T30 II ^{f} ^{T}			X-T50 ^{f} ^{T}
MILC	X-mount; APS-C sensor									_{15} X-T100 ^{F} ^{T}	X-T200 ^{A} ^{T}					
MILC	X-mount; APS-C sensor			X-E1	X-E2		X-E2s		X-E3 ^{T}			X-E4 ^{f} ^{T}				X-E5 ^{f} ^{T}
MILC	X-mount; APS-C sensor				X-M1 ^{f}											X-M5 ^{A} ^{T}
MILC	X-mount; APS-C sensor				X-A1 ^{f}	X-A2 ^{f}		X-A3 ^{f} ^{T}	_{15} X-A5 ^{f} ^{T}		X-A7 ^{A} ^{T}					
MILC	X-mount; APS-C sensor							X-A10 ^{f}	X-A20 ^{f} ^{T}							
Compact	Prime lens APS-C sensor	X100		X100S		X100T		X100F			X100V ^{f} ^{T}				X100VI ^{f} ^{T}	
Compact	Prime lens APS-C sensor						X70 ^{f} ^{T}			XF10 ^{T}						
Compact	Prime lens 1" sensor															X half ^{T}
Compact	Zoom lens^{2}/_{3}" sensor		X10	X20		X30 ^{f}										
Compact	Zoom lens^{2}/_{3}" sensor				XQ1	XQ2										
Compact	Zoom lens^{2}/_{3}" sensor			XF1												
Bridge	^{2}/_{3}" sensor		X-S1 ^{f}													
Type	Lens															
Type	Lens	2011	2012	2013	2014	2015	2016	2017	2018	2019	2020	2021	2022	2023	2024	2025

Type	Lens	2011	2012	2013	2014	2015	2016	2017	2018	2019	2020	2021	2022	2023	2024	2025
MILC	G-mount; Medium format sensor							GFX 50S ^{A} ^{T}					GFX50S II ^{A} ^{T}			
MILC	G-mount; Medium format sensor									GFX 50R ^{A} ^{T}						
MILC	G-mount; Medium format sensor										GFX100 ^{A} ^{T}				GFX100 II ^{A} ^{T}	
MILC	G-mount; Medium format sensor											GFX100 IR ^{A} ^{T}				
MILC	G-mount; Medium format sensor											GFX100S ^{A} ^{T}				
MILC	X-mount; APS-C sensor		X-Pro1				X-Pro2				X-Pro3 ^{F} ^{T}					
MILC	X-mount; APS-C sensor								X-H1 ^{A} ^{T}					X-H2S ^{A} ^{T}		
MILC	X-mount; APS-C sensor													X-H2 ^{A} ^{T}		
MILC	X-mount; APS-C sensor											X-S10 ^{A} ^{T}			X-S20 ^{A} ^{T}	
MILC	X-mount; APS-C sensor				X-T1 ^{F}			X-T2 ^{A}		X-T3 ^{A} ^{T}		X-T4 ^{A} ^{T}		X-T5 ^{A} ^{T}		
MILC	X-mount; APS-C sensor						X-T10 ^{F}	X-T20 ^{A} ^{T}		X-T30 ^{A} ^{T}			X-T30 II ^{A} ^{T}			
MILC	X-mount; APS-C sensor									X-T100 ^{A} ^{T}	X-T200 ^{A} ^{T}					
MILC	X-mount; APS-C sensor			X-E1	X-E2		X-E2s		X-E3 ^{T}			X-E4 ^{T}				
MILC	X-mount; APS-C sensor				X-M1 ^{F}											X-M5 ^{F}
MILC	X-mount; APS-C sensor				X-A1 ^{F}	X-A2 ^{F}		X-A3 ^{F} ^{T}	X-A5 ^{F} ^{T}		X-A7 ^{A} ^{T}					
								X-A10 ^{F}	X-A20 ^{F} ^{T}							
Compact	Prime lens APS-C sensor	X100		X100S		X100T		X100F			X100V ^{F} ^{T}				X100VI ^{F} ^{T}	
Compact	Prime lens APS-C sensor						X70 ^{F} ^{T}			XF10 ^{T}						
Compact	Zoom lens^{2}/_{3}" sensor		X10	X20		X30 ^{F}										
Compact	Zoom lens^{2}/_{3}" sensor				XQ1	XQ2										
Compact	Zoom lens^{2}/_{3}" sensor			XF1												
Bridge	^{2}/_{3}" sensor		X-S1 ^{F}													
Type	Lens															
Type	Lens	2011	2012	2013	2014	2015	2016	2017	2018	2019	2020	2021	2022	2023	2024	2025
