= Autobracketing =

Camera feature of combining shots

Autobracketing is a feature of some more advanced cameras, whether film or digital cameras, particularly single-lens reflex cameras, where the camera will take several successive shots (often three) with slightly different settings. The images may be automatically combined, for example into one high-dynamic-range image, or they may be stored separately so the best-looking pictures can be picked later from the batch. When the photographer achieves the same result by changing the camera settings between each shot, this is simply called bracketing.

== Parameter altered ==
The bracketing is typically for one specific parameter:

=== Exposure ===
Exposure autobracketing (often abbreviated to AEB for automatic exposure bracketing or BR for Bracketing) is the most common form. In this, the camera is set to capture the same image several times with different exposure settings, both over-exposed and under-exposed (lighter and darker) compared to the current setting on the camera, which may already include exposure compensation.

Depending on the camera, the difference between each of the autobracketed shots could be anywhere from one-quarter (Note: The Minolta 7000 and 9000 (1985), in conjunction with the Minolta Program Back Super 70 / 90 (PBS-70/PBS-90) or the 100-Exposure Back EB-90, support aperture and shutter speed settings in quarter-step increments. In order to cope with the finer granularity, aperture and shutter speed settings are displayed in a proprietary suffixed notation, that is, a full f-stop of 2.8 is displayed as 2.8_{0}, the next quarter-steps would be 2.8_{1}, 2.8_{2}, 2.8_{3}, before it would continue with 4.0_{0}, etc. Auto-exposure bracketing can be configured for a start point between -6.0EV and +6.0EV in 1/4EV steps, with a step granularity of either 1/4, 1/2, 1 or 2EV and a bracket length ranging from 1 to 8 frames. Additionally, it can be combined with built-in timer and intervalometer functions, which provide options to set the start date and time (that is, the year, month, day, hour, and minute of the first exposure in the row), the number of groups (1 to 99 frames), the count of frames per group (1 to 9) as well as the interval time (up to 99h, 59min, 59s).) up to three (Note: With firmware 2.0, the Sony α DSLR-A850 and DSLR-A900 support an additional auto-exposure bracking setting for ±3.0 EV in three frames. (Sony press release as of 2 December 2010 Archived 25 August 2011 at the Wayback Machine)) full stops in each direction, in full, half, third or quarter stop (Note: Photographers commonly refer to exposure changes in terms of "stops", but properly, an aperture stop is a device that regulates the amount of light, while a step is a division of a scale. The standard exposure scale consists of power-of-two steps; a one-step exposure increase doubles the exposure, while a one-step decrease halves the exposure; these steps are what are commonly referred to as stops.) increments, ranging from two up to nine shots in series. Sometimes it is possible to either define the order, in which the shots will be taken, or to give an offset as a start-point of the bracketing series. More sophisticated equipment allows auto-exposure bracketing to be combined with timer and intervalometer functions as well.

Cameras can perform autobracketing by adjusting either the shutter speed (typically in aperture priority mode, sometimes also in manual or program mode) or the aperture setting (typically in shutter priority mode). In programmed exposure mode, many cameras will alter both parameters at the same time. Some cameras allow to swap the parameter used for shifting in manual mode. (Note: By default, various Minolta, Konica Minolta and Sony α cameras (including the Maxxum 9, Maxxum 7, Maxxum 7D, DSLR-A850 and DSLR-A900) will shift the shutter speed when bracketing in manual mode, however, if the AEL button is pressed (or set on hold via custom-function) while releasing the shutter, they will instead shift the aperture value.) Digital cameras may also alter the ISO setting if auto-ISO is enabled.

Exposure autobracketing is most commonly used with color reversal film (slide film) because of its small exposure latitude compared with print film (which has a wide exposure latitude) and digital cameras (which enable the photographer to review the captured image). In digital photography, autobracketing is convenient to shoot pictures for high-dynamic-range imaging.

=== Flash ===
Automatic flash bracketing (sometimes abbreviated to FBR for flash bracketing or FEB for flash exposure bracketing) is typically performed by altering the flash output of a connected dedicated flash accordingly. Using non-dedicated studio flashes, for example on the PC socket, flash bracketing can be carried out by altering the aperture, however, this will also affect ambient light and the depth of field.

If, in manual mode, a camera defaults to alter the shutter speed, it might be necessary to swap the parameters used for shifting in order for the camera to alter the aperture instead.

Since the flash may need time to recharge between the shots, some cameras fall back to single-advance drive mode during auto flash bracketing, even if they are otherwise configured for continuous-advance drive.

=== ISO ===
Automatic ISO bracketing simulates exposure bracketing by altering the ISO or signal gain prior to conversion of the image to JPEG or other image file format. The actual exposure values (aperture and shutter speed) are usually kept constant. Auto ISO bracketing is not a common feature of digital cameras.

=== White-balance ===
Another common form of autobracketing is white balance autobracketing (sometimes abbreviated to WBB for white balance bracketing); this applies only to digital cameras, not to film cameras.

This function provides a way of dealing with mixed lighting by having the camera take one shot and process the raw sensor data several times for slightly different white point settings, with both higher and lower color temperatures (bluer and redder) compared to the current setting on the camera. Typically, the amount of offset can be configured.

Since shooting in a camera's raw format (if supported) the white balance can be arbitrarily changed in postprocessing as well at a later stage, white balance bracketing is particularly useful for reviewing different white balance settings in the field.

=== Focus ===
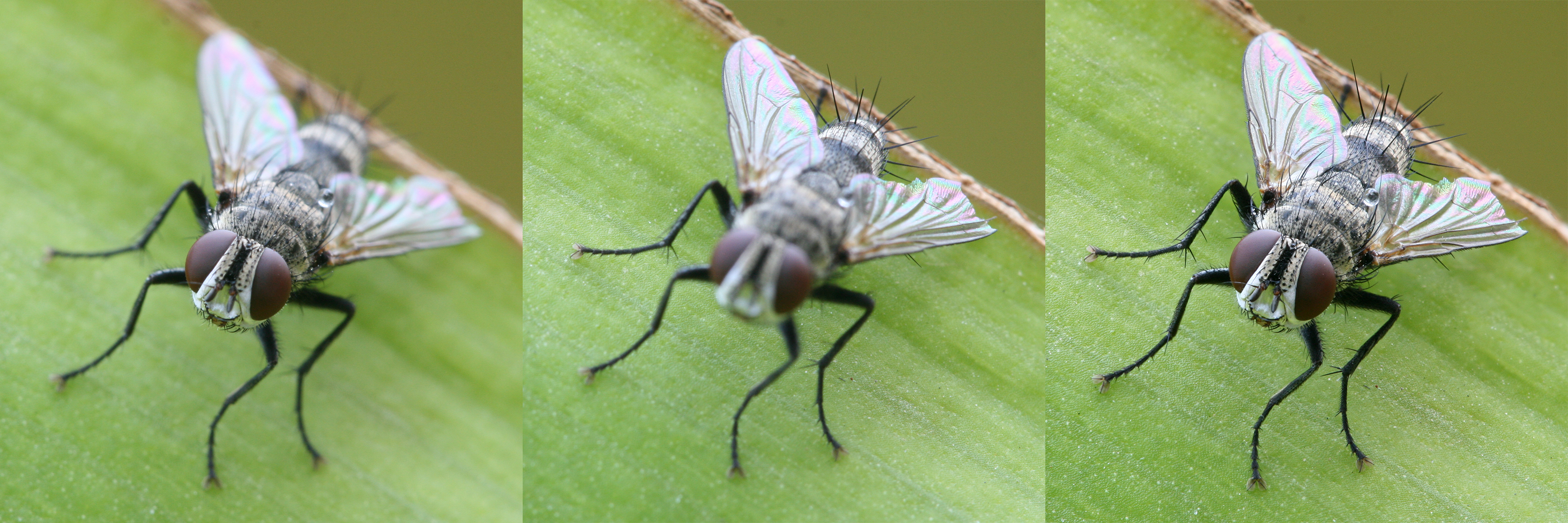
A series of images demonstrating a focus bracket. The image on the left shows a single shot taken at f/10 with the features of the fly closest to the camera. The center image shows the features farthest from the camera. The image on the right shows focus stacking: a sequence of six incrementally focused images of the fly assembled to make a composite image using CombineZM.

=== Depth of field ===
The Minolta Maxxum 7's STF function is an automatically calculated and pre-compensated seven-fold multi-exposure with depth-of-field bracketing which emulates the smooth bokeh effect of Smooth Trans Focus.

== Dual-bracketing ==
Some cameras which provide bracketing of two parameters at the same time.
