= CZM =

CZM may stand for:

- Coastal Zone Management; see Integrated coastal zone management
- Cozumel International Airport
- T.W.G.Hs Chen Zao Men College, a secondary school in Hong Kong
- CombineZM
