= Helicon Focus =

- Helicon Focus 4.40 Running on Windows XP
- Developer: Helicon Soft Ltd.
- Stable release: 8.3.11 / February 16, 2026
- Operating system: Windows, Mac OS X
- Type: Digital image processing
- License: Proprietary
- Website: Heliconsoft.com

Helicon Focus is a proprietary commercial digital image processing tool, first released in 2003, developed and published by Helicon Soft Limited. Like programs such as CombineZ or Zerene Stacker, Helicon Focus is designed to blend the focused areas of several partially focused digital photographs to increase the depth of field (DOF) in an image.

== Overview ==
Helicon Focus can be used to increase DOF in any situation, though its primary uses are in macro photography, landscape photography and photo-microscopy. In macro photography, the DOF is often very small. To increase it, Helicon Focus is capable of merging several differently focused images together to create one image where the subject is entirely in focus.

== Features ==
- Automatic adjustments during stacking
- "Dust map" for removing black points from the resulting images
- Supports most common file types, including RAW, TIFF, JPEG, JPEG 2000, and BMP
- Can add text and a scale bar
- 3D stack visualization and Wavefront .obj export
- (In Pro) Retouch brushes to manually brush in any focused (or unfocused) areas that weren't merged properly
- (In Pro) Create panoramas
- Create image stack animations
- Batch processing

== See also ==
- Helicon Filter
- Depth of field
