= TSOM =

Through-Focus Scanning Optical Microscopy (TSOM) is an imaging method that produces nanometer-scale three-dimensional measurement sensitivity using a conventional bright-field optical microscope. TSOM has been introduced and maintained by Ravikiran Attota at NIST. It was given an R&D 100 Award in 2010. In the TSOM method a target is scanned through the focus of an optical microscope, acquiring conventional optical images at different focal positions. The TSOM images are constructed using the through-focus optical images. A TSOM image is unique under given experimental conditions and is sensitive to changes in the dimensions of a target in a distinct way, which is very well applicable in nanoscale dimensional metrology. The TSOM method is alleged to have several nanometrology applications ranging from nanoparticles to through-silicon-vias (TSV).

The National Institute of Standards and Technology, USA, produced a short Video on YouTube on the TSOM method.

== See also ==
- Focus stacking
