= Focus stacking =

Digital image processing technique

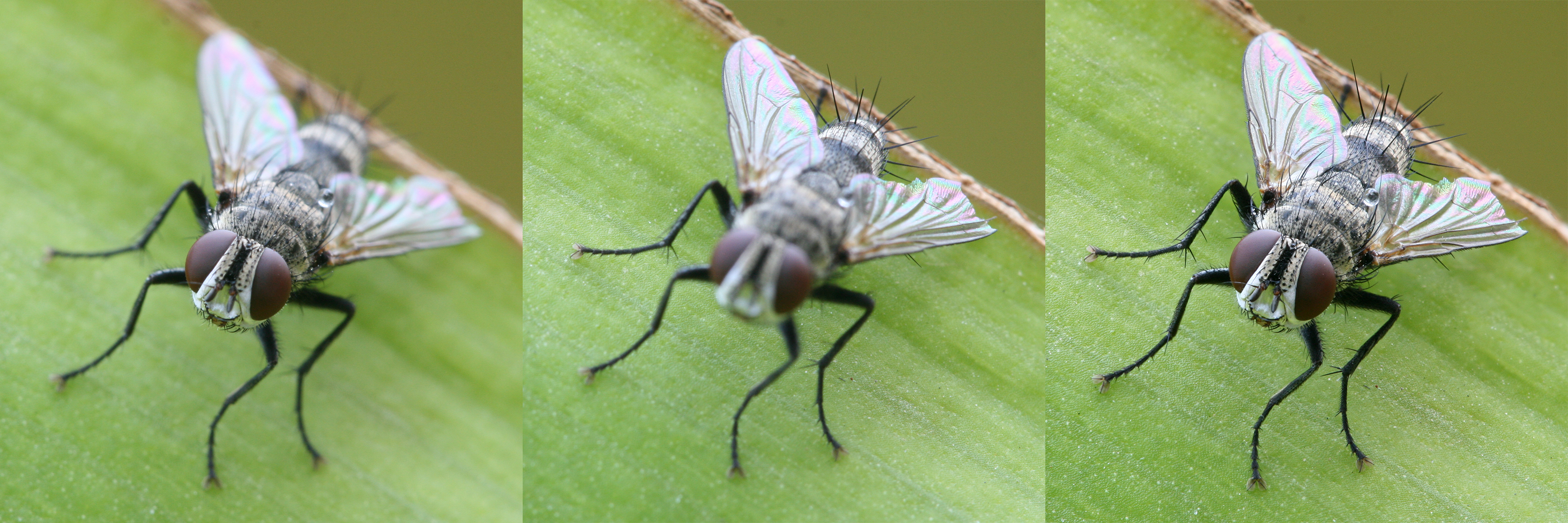
Series of images demonstrating a six-image focus bracket of a Tachinid fly. First two images illustrate typical DOF of a single image at f/10 while the third image is the composite of six images.

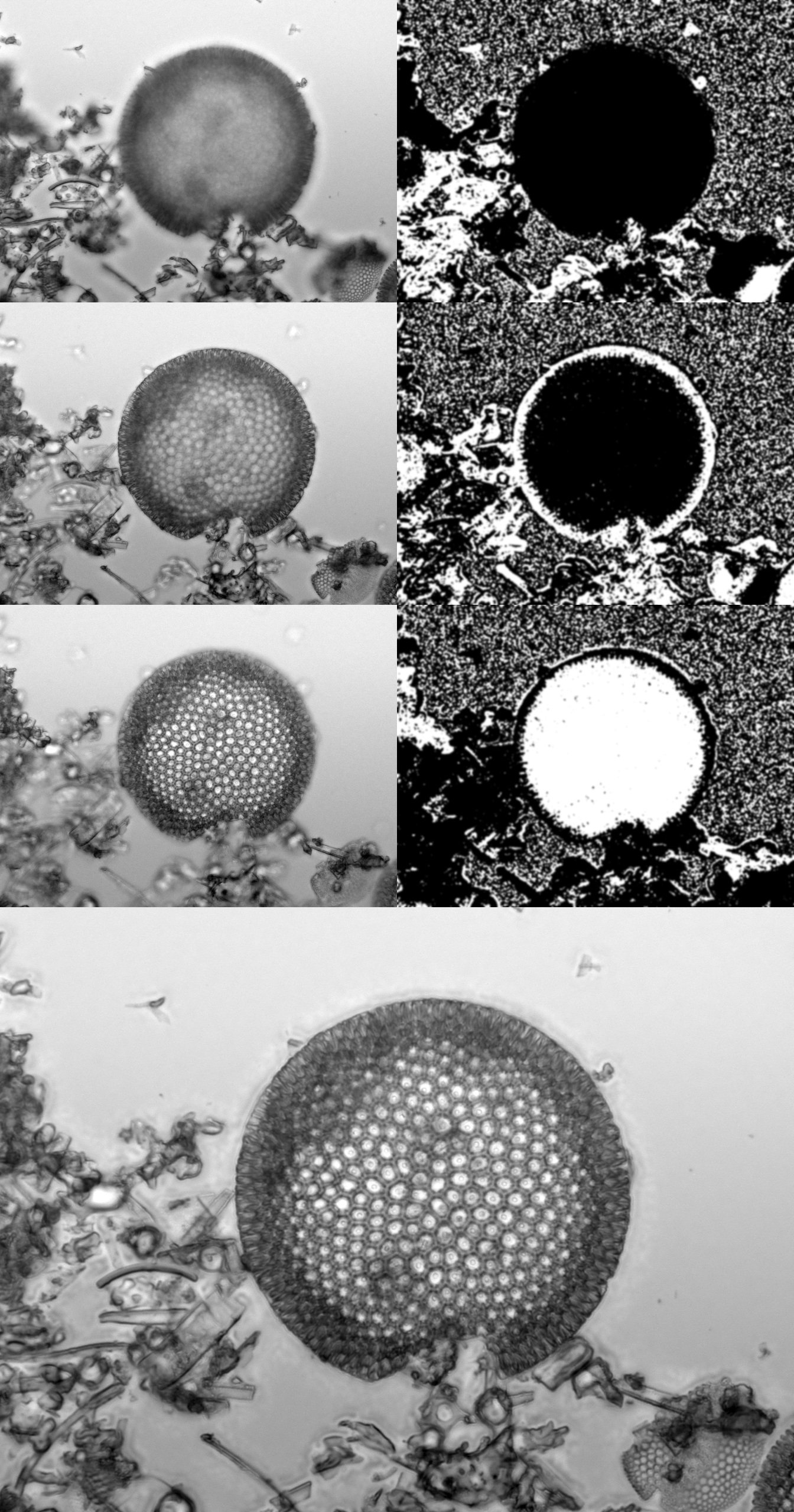
Focus stacking (for extended depth of field) in bright field light microscopy. This example is of a diatom microfossil in diatomaceous earth. Three source images at different focus distances (top left) are combined with masks (top right) to obtain the contributions of their respective images to the final focus stacked image (bottom). Black is no contribution; white is full.

Focus stacking – also called focal plane merging, z-stacking, focus bracketing or focus blending – is a digital image processing technique which combines multiple images taken at different focus distances to give a resulting image with a greater depth of field (DOF) than any of the individual source images. Focus stacking can be used in any situation where individual images have a very shallow depth of field; macro photography and optical microscopy are two typical examples. Focus stacking can also be useful in landscape photography.

Focus stacking offers flexibility: since it is a computational technique, images with several different depths of field can be generated in post-processing and compared for best artistic merit or scientific clarity. Focus stacking also allows generation of images physically impossible with normal imaging equipment; images with nonplanar focus regions can be generated. Alternative techniques for generating images with increased or flexible depth of field include wavefront coding, light-field cameras and tilt.

== Technique ==
The starting point for focus stacking is a series of images captured at different focus distances; in each image different areas of the sample will be in focus. While none of these images has the sample entirely in focus, they collectively contain all the data required to generate an image which has all parts of the sample in focus. In-focus regions of each image may be detected automatically, for example via edge detection or Fourier analysis, or selected manually. The in-focus patches are then blended together to generate the final image.

This processing is also called z-stacking, focal plane merging (or zedification in French).

=== In photography ===
Getting sufficient depth of field can be particularly challenging in macro photography, because depth of field is smaller (shallower) for objects nearer the camera, so if a small object fills the frame, it is often so close that its entire depth cannot be in focus at once. Depth of field is normally increased by stopping down aperture (using a larger f-number), but beyond a certain point, stopping down causes blurring due to diffraction, which counteracts the benefit of being in focus. It also reduces the luminosity of the image. Focus stacking allows the depth of field of images taken at the sharpest aperture to be effectively increased. The images at right illustrate the increase in DOF that can be achieved by combining multiple exposures.

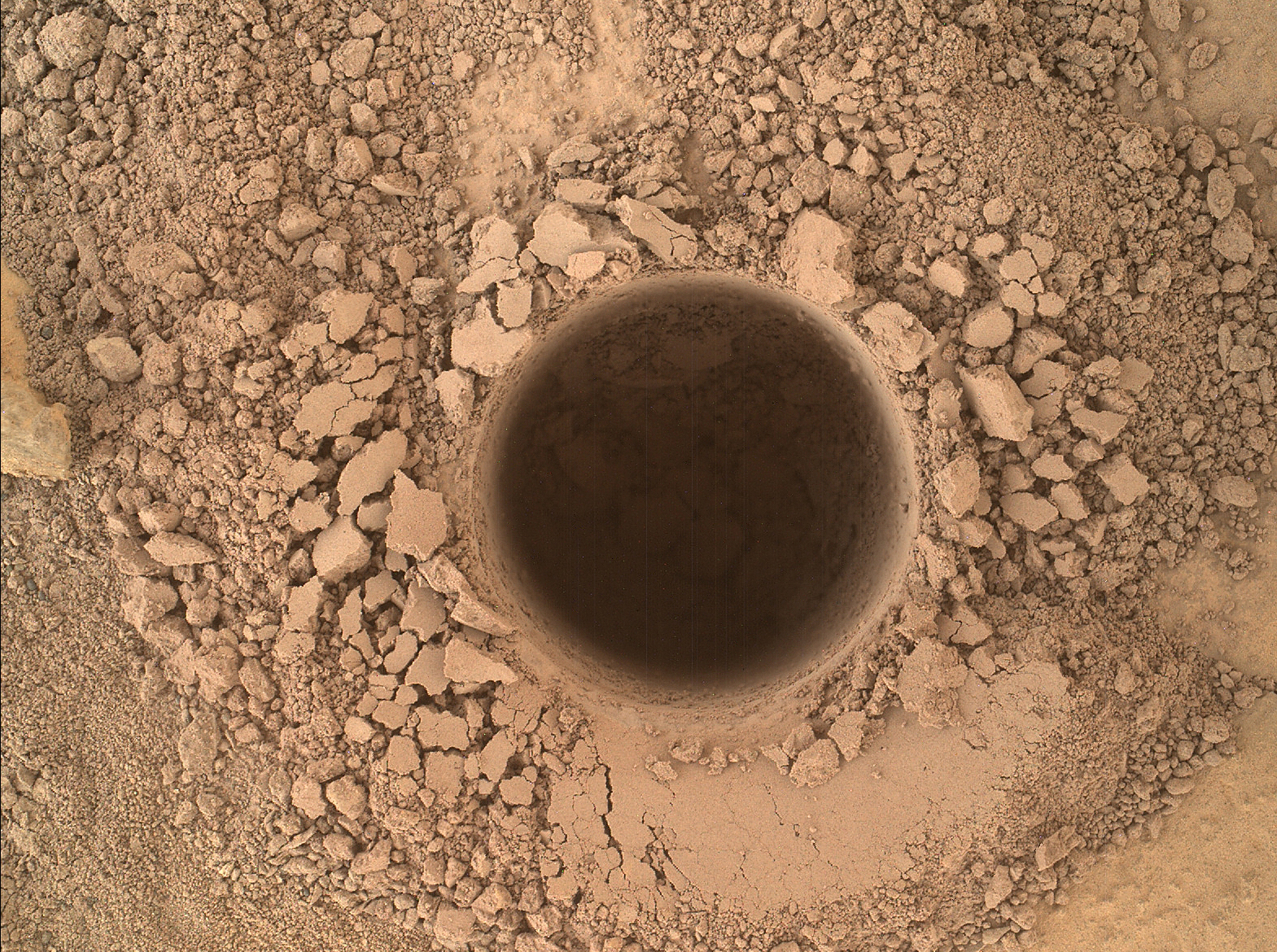
Stacked image of the Curiosity Rover's first sampling hole in Mount Sharp. The hole is 1.6 cm (0.63 in) wide and 6.7 cm (2.6 in) deep.

The Mars Hand Lens Imager (MAHLI) on the Mars Science Laboratory rover Curiosity can merge a focus stack of up to eight images on board, producing a color best-focus image and a grayscale range map.

=== In microscopy ===
In microscopy, high numerical apertures are desirable to capture as much light as possible from a small sample. A high numerical aperture (equivalent to a low f-number) gives a very shallow depth of field. Higher magnification objective lenses generally have shallower depth of field: Nikon gives calculated values of about 1.0 μm for a 40× objective with a numerical aperture of 0.65 and 0.19 μm for a 100× objective with a numerical aperture of 0.95. When observing a sample directly, the limitations of the shallow depth of field are easy to circumvent by focusing up and down through the sample; to effectively present microscopy data of a complex 3D structure in 2D, focus stacking is a very useful technique.

Atomic resolution scanning transmission electron microscopy encounters similar difficulties, where specimen features are much larger than the depth of field. By taking a through-focal series, the depth of focus can be reconstructed to create a single image entirely in focus.

== Software and applications ==
Focus stacking software
Name	Primary author	Application type	Platform	License
Adobe Photoshop	Adobe	Desktop	Windows, Mac OS X	Proprietary
Affinity Photo 'Focus Merge'	Serif	Desktop	Windows, Mac OS X	Proprietary
Aphelion with Multifocus extension	ADCIS	Desktop	Windows	Proprietary, 30-day trial
Amira / Avizo 'Image Stack Projection'	Thermo Fisher	Desktop	Windows, Mac OS X, Linux	Proprietary
CamRanger	CamRanger	Desktop / Mobile	iOS, Android, Mac OS X, Windows	Proprietary
Chasys Draw IES	John Paul Chacha	Desktop	Windows	Proprietary
CombineZ	Alan Hadley	Desktop	Windows	GPL
CUVI Vision & Imaging Library	TunaCode	Desktop / Embedded	Windows, Linux	Proprietary
Enfuse (combined with align_image_stack or similar)	Andrew Mihal and hugin development team	Desktop	Multiplatform	GPL
FocusFusion	DelphiTools	Desktop	Windows	Proprietary
Focus Stacker	Alexander Boltnev, Olga Kacher	Desktop	Mac OS X	Proprietary
Focus Stacking Online	Focus Stacking Online	Web application	All	Proprietary
Helicon Focus	Danylo Kozub	Desktop	Windows, Mac OS X	Proprietary, 30-day trial
ImageJ with Extended Depth of Field Plugin	Alex Prudencio, Jesse Berent, Daniel Sage	Desktop	Unix, Linux, Windows, Mac OS 9 and Mac OS X	Public domain (ImageJ); GPL (plugin)
MacroFusion	Dariusz Duma	Desktop	Linux	GPL
Mathematica via ImageFocusCombine	Wolfram Research	Desktop / Web	Windows, Mac OS X, Linux	Proprietary, 15-day trial
Open Galileo	Brandon Antonio Segura Torres	Desktop	Windows	Free and open-source software
Picolay	Heribert Cypionka	Desktop	Windows	Freeware
QuickPHOTO with Deep Focus extension	Promicra	Desktop	Windows	Proprietary, 30-day trial
Shine Stacker	Luca Lista	Desktop	Windows, Mac OS X, Linux	LGPL
Shutter Stream Product Photography Software	Iconasys	Desktop	Windows, Mac OS X	Proprietary
Zerene Stacker	Rik Littlefield	Desktop	Windows, Mac OS X, Linux	Proprietary, 30-day trial

== Gallery ==
=== Pictures ===
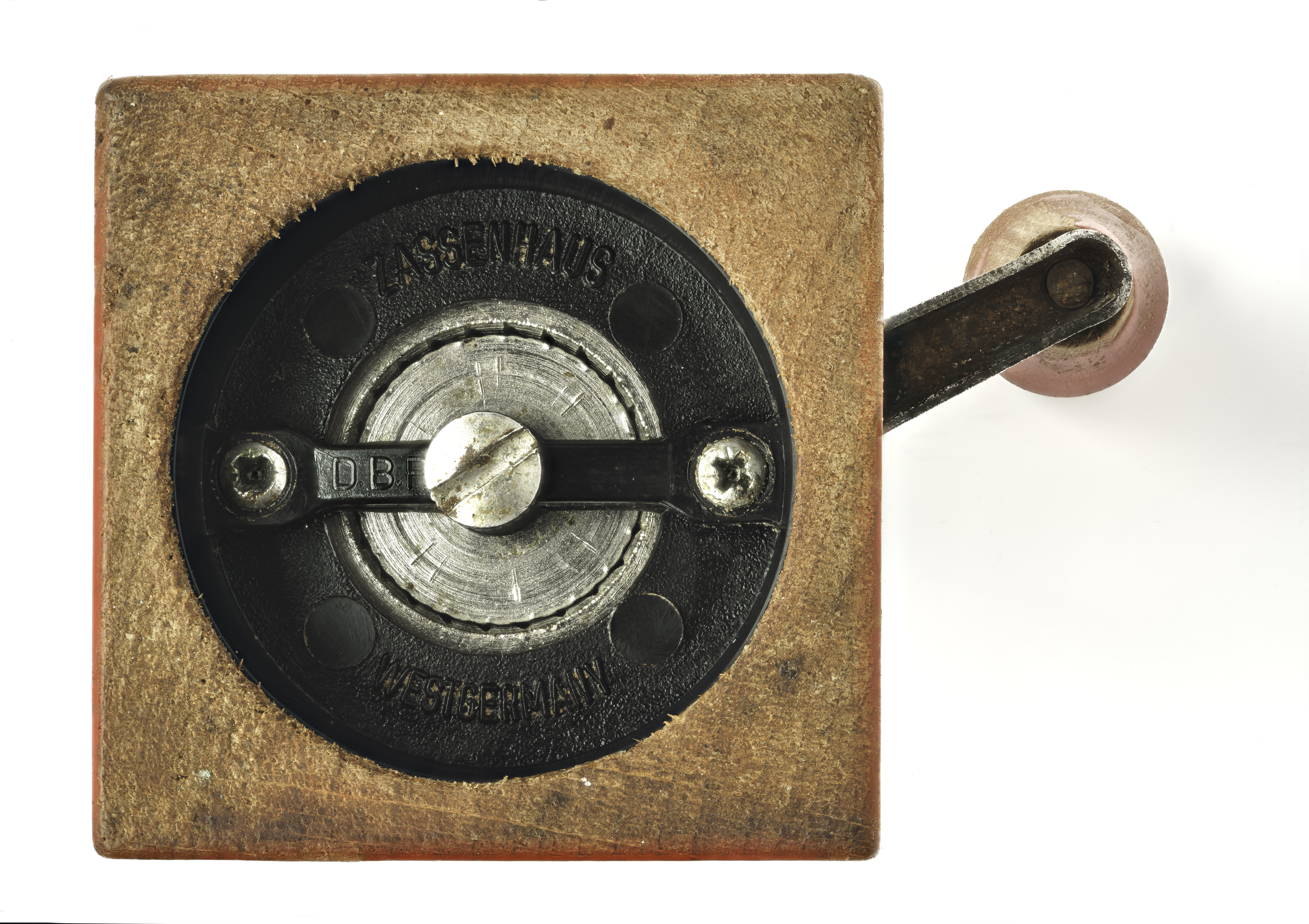
Pepper mill, stack of 28 frames

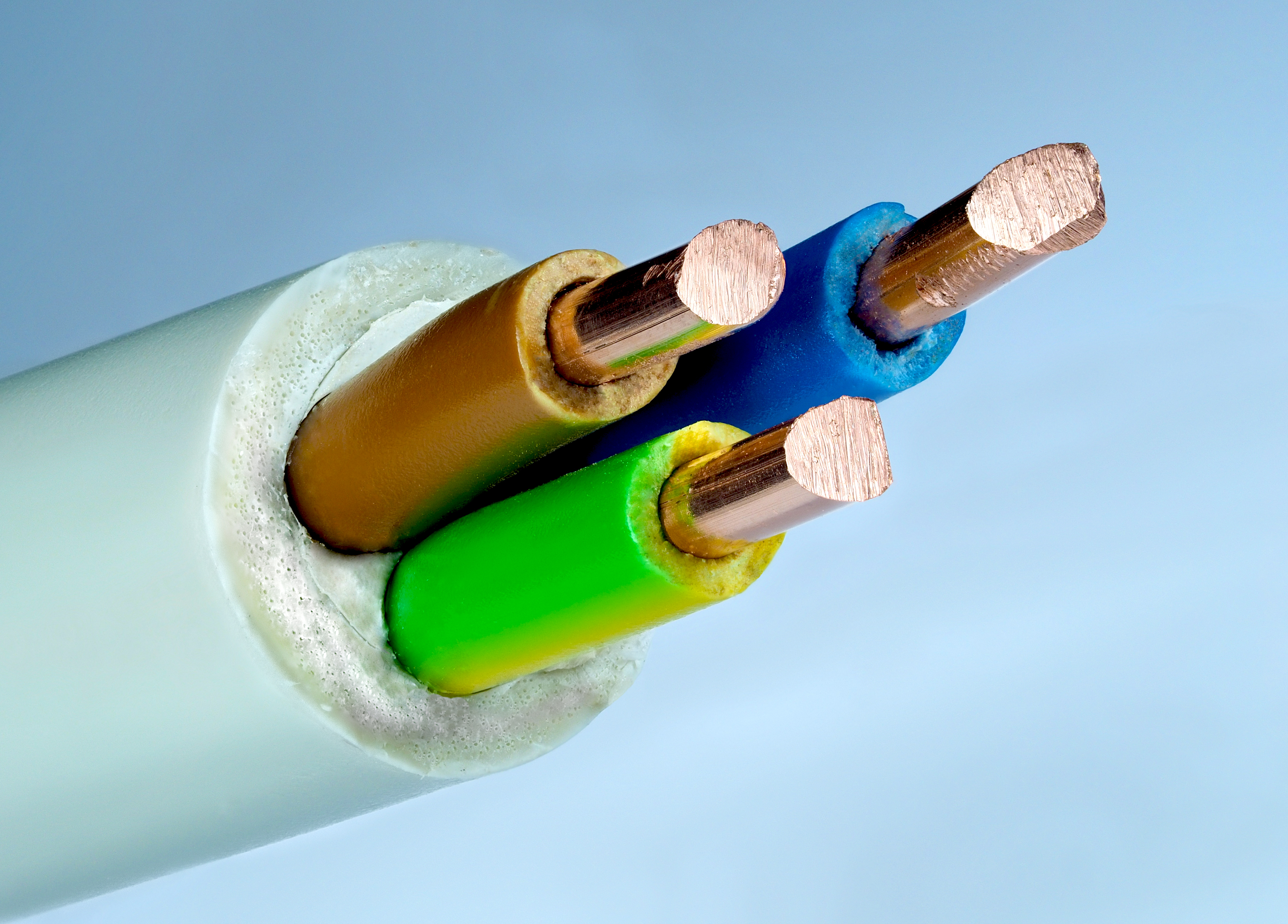
Stacked image of 3 × 2.5 mm electric wires

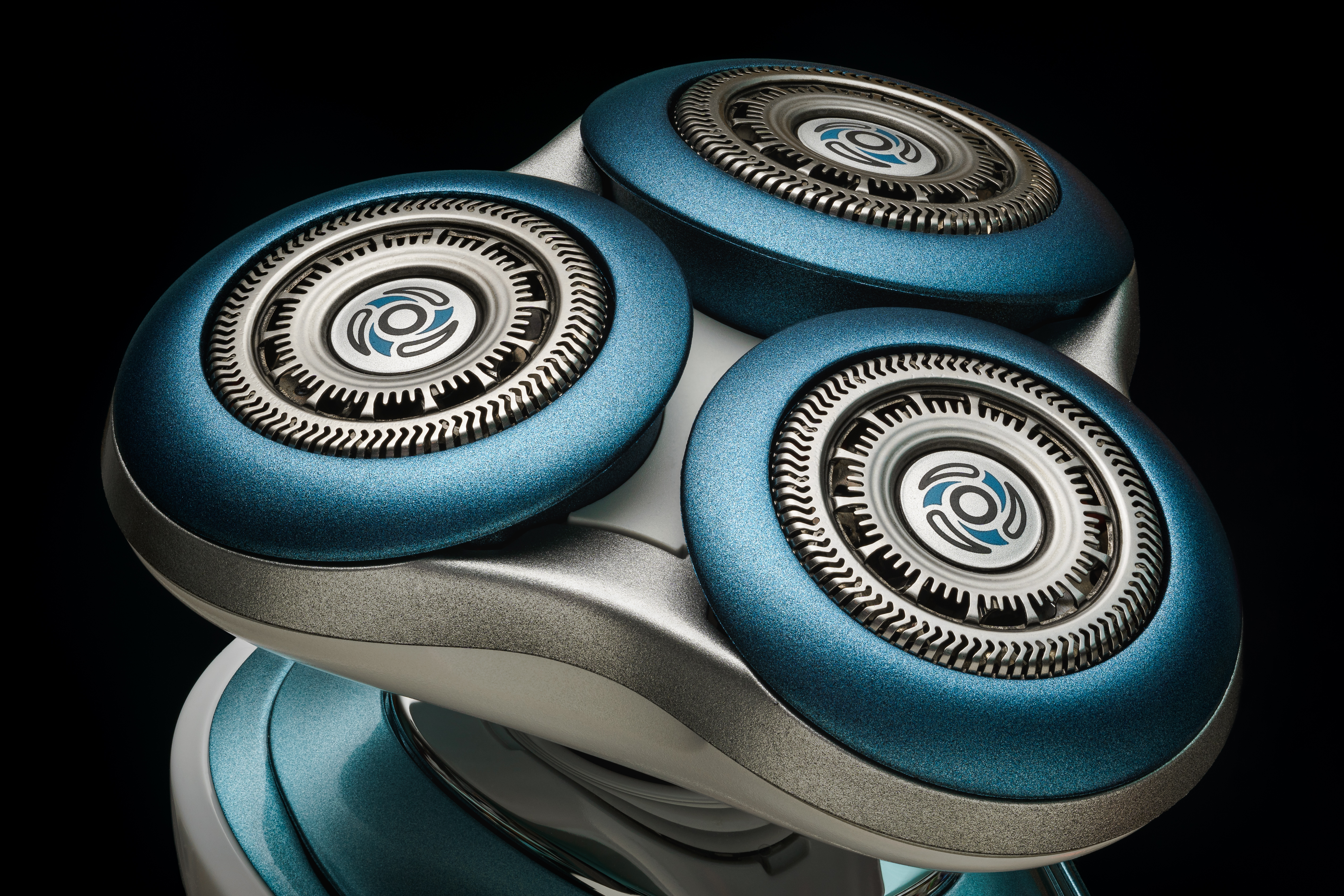
Shaver head, stack of 36 frames, retouched

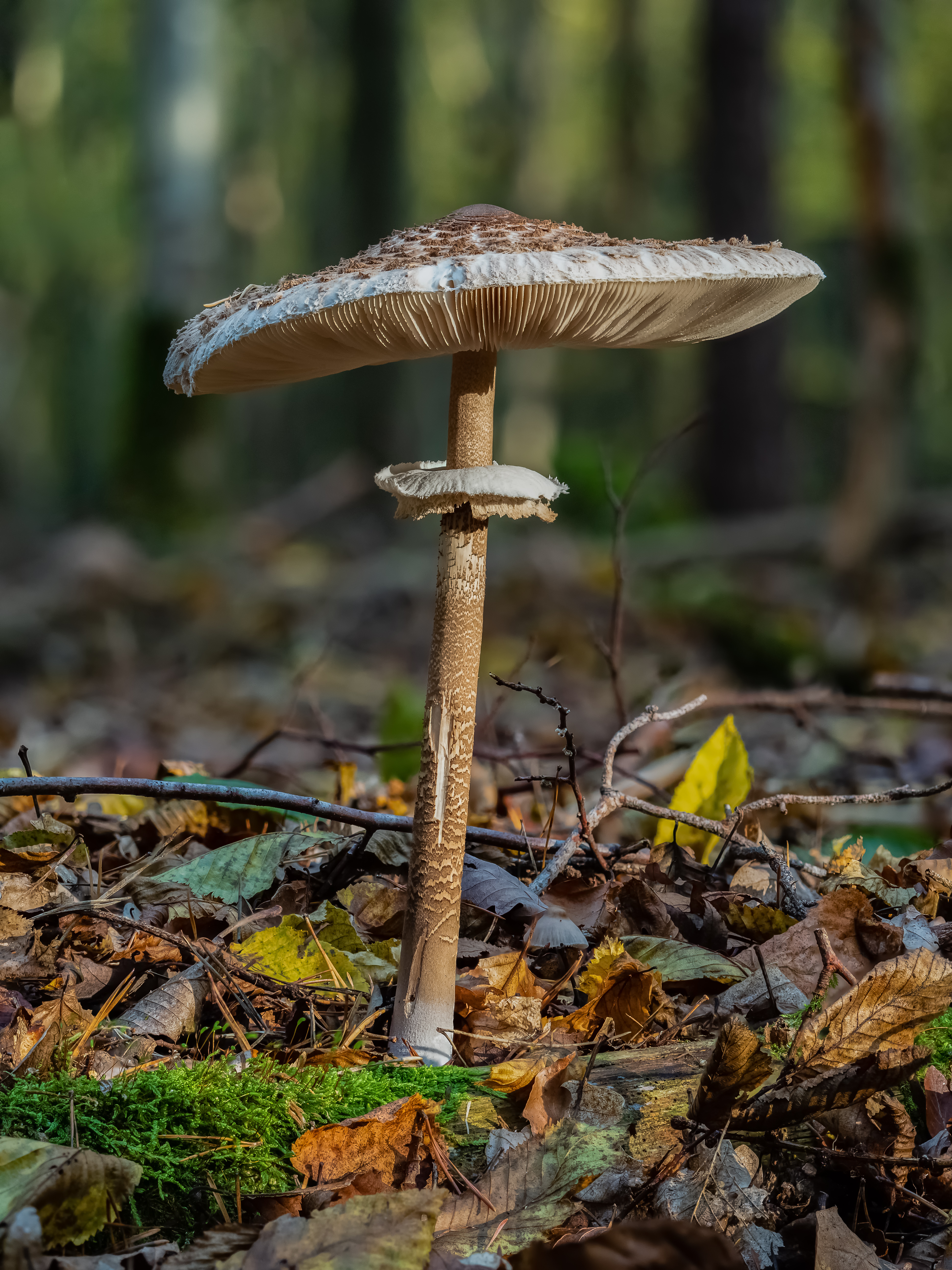
Macrolepiota procera, stack of 15 frames

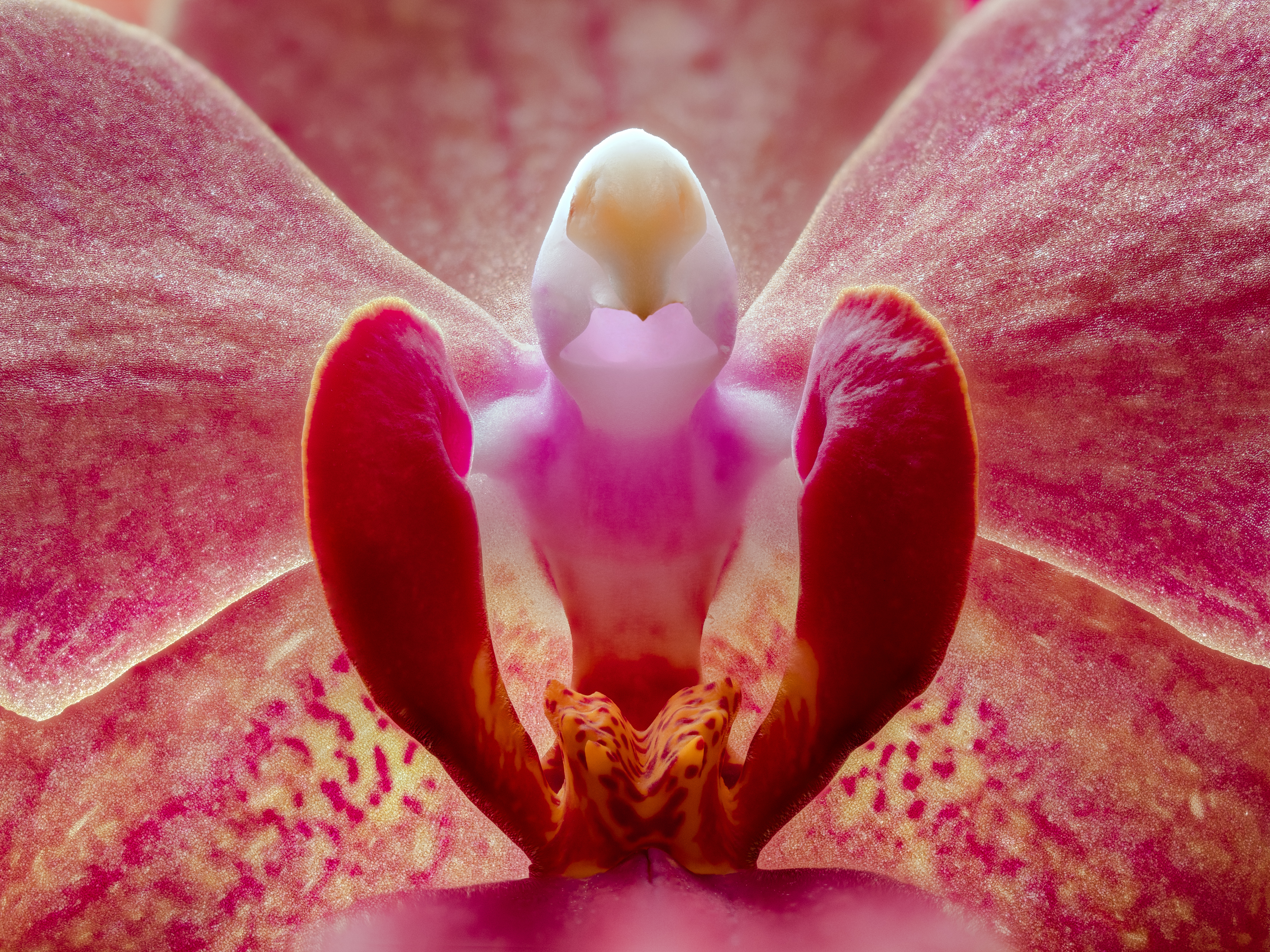
Stacked image of the inner ridge of an orchid blossom

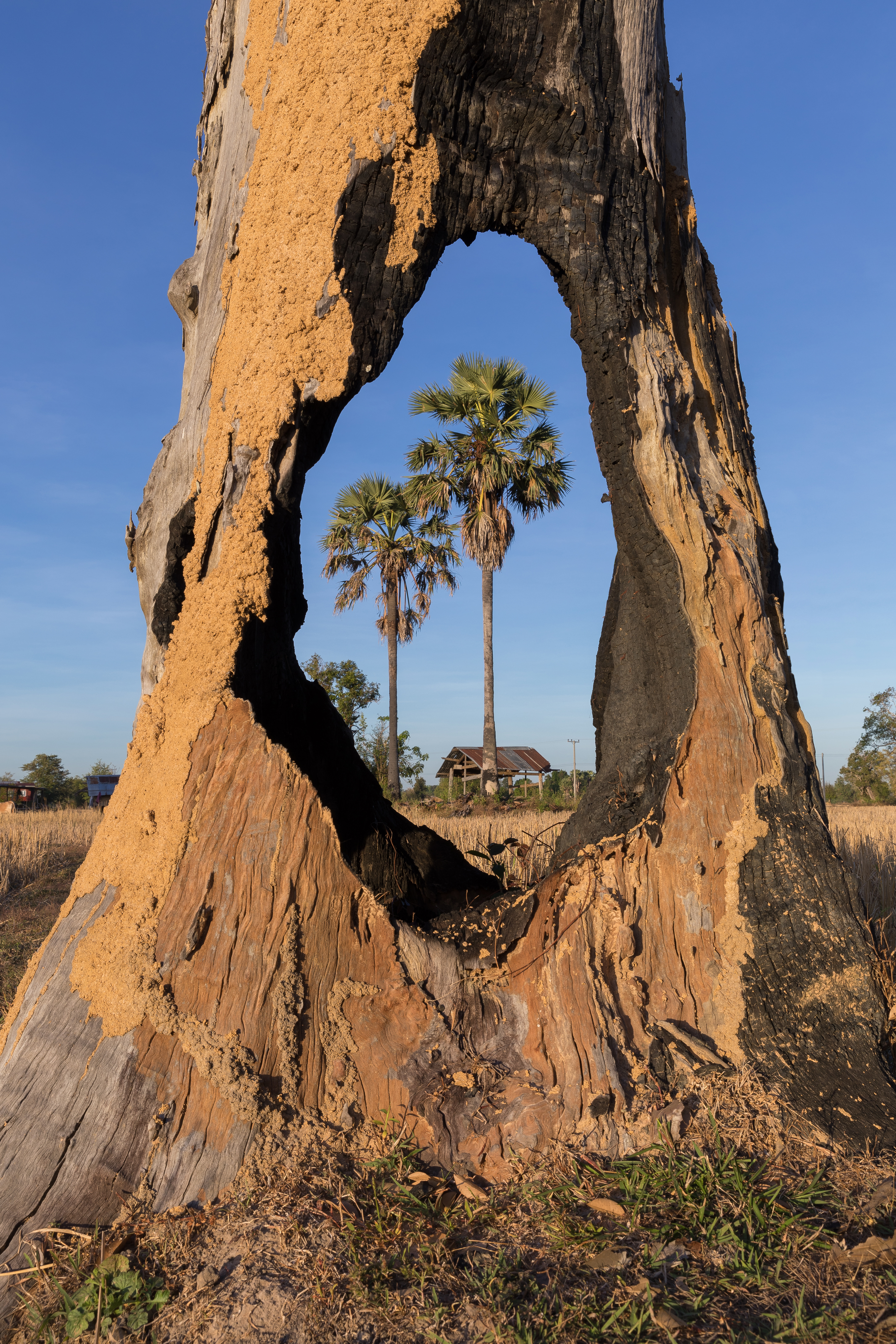
Stacked image of two Arecaceae viewed through a hole in a tree trunk

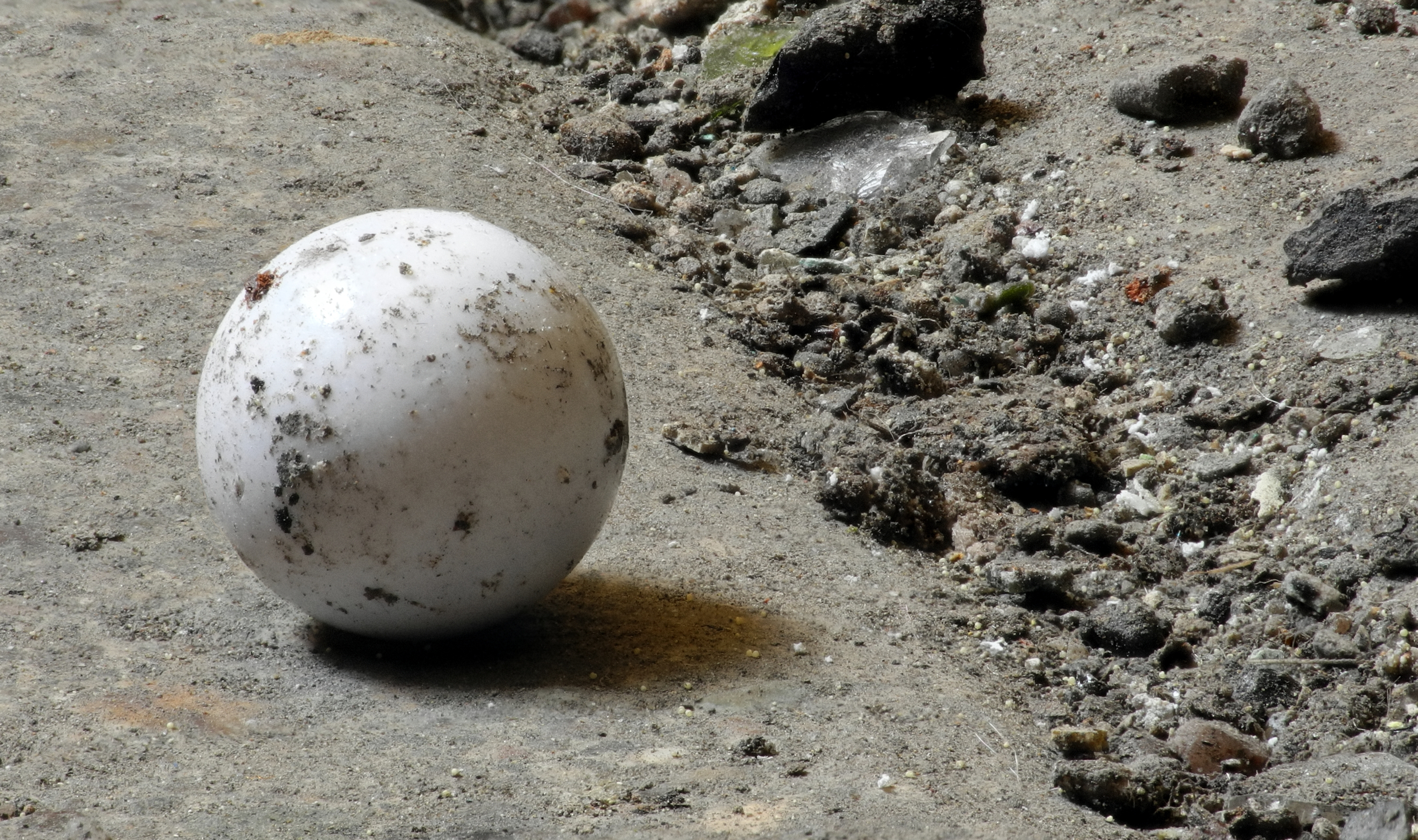
Pellet, stack of 32 frames

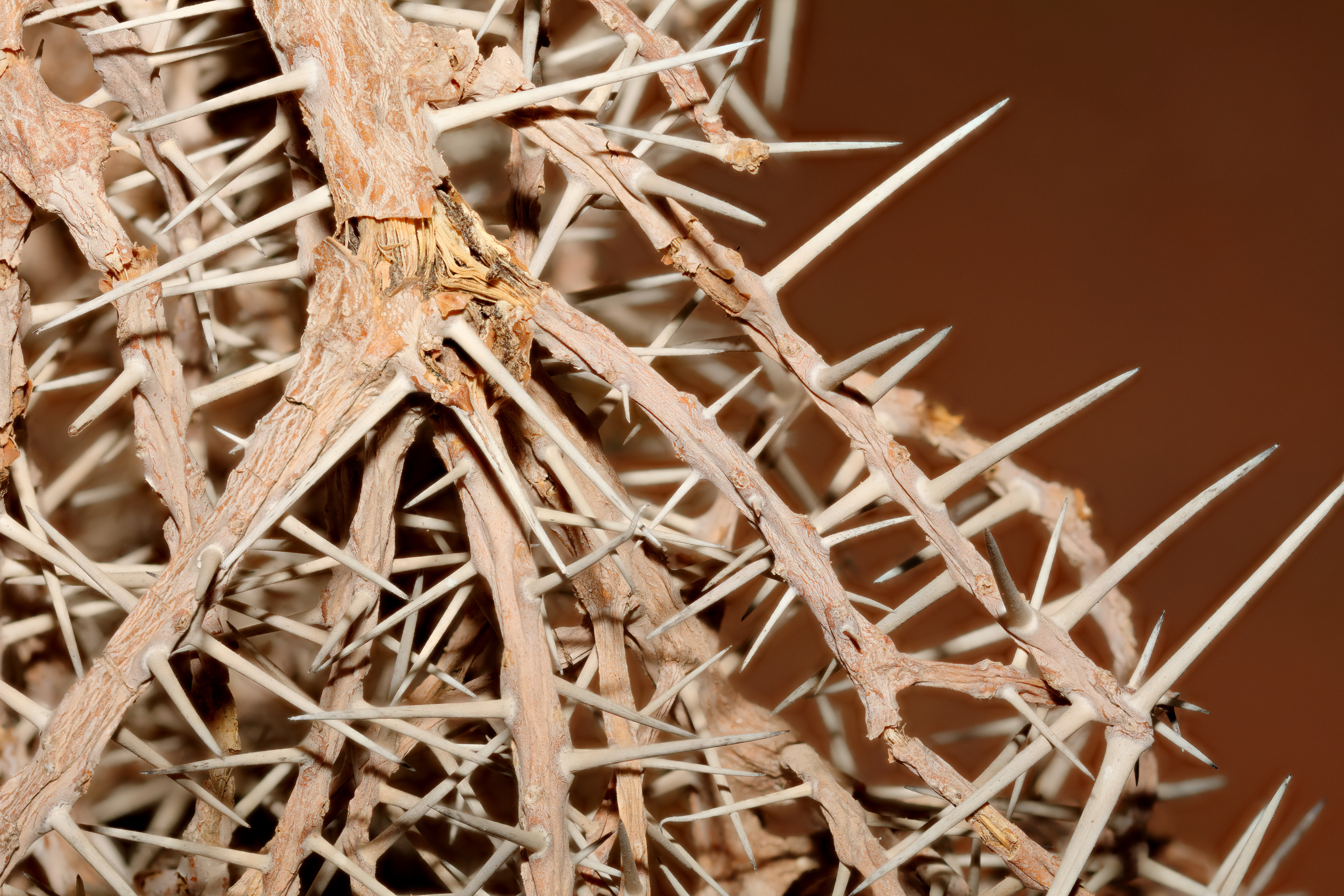
Alluaudia comosa, stack of 10 frames

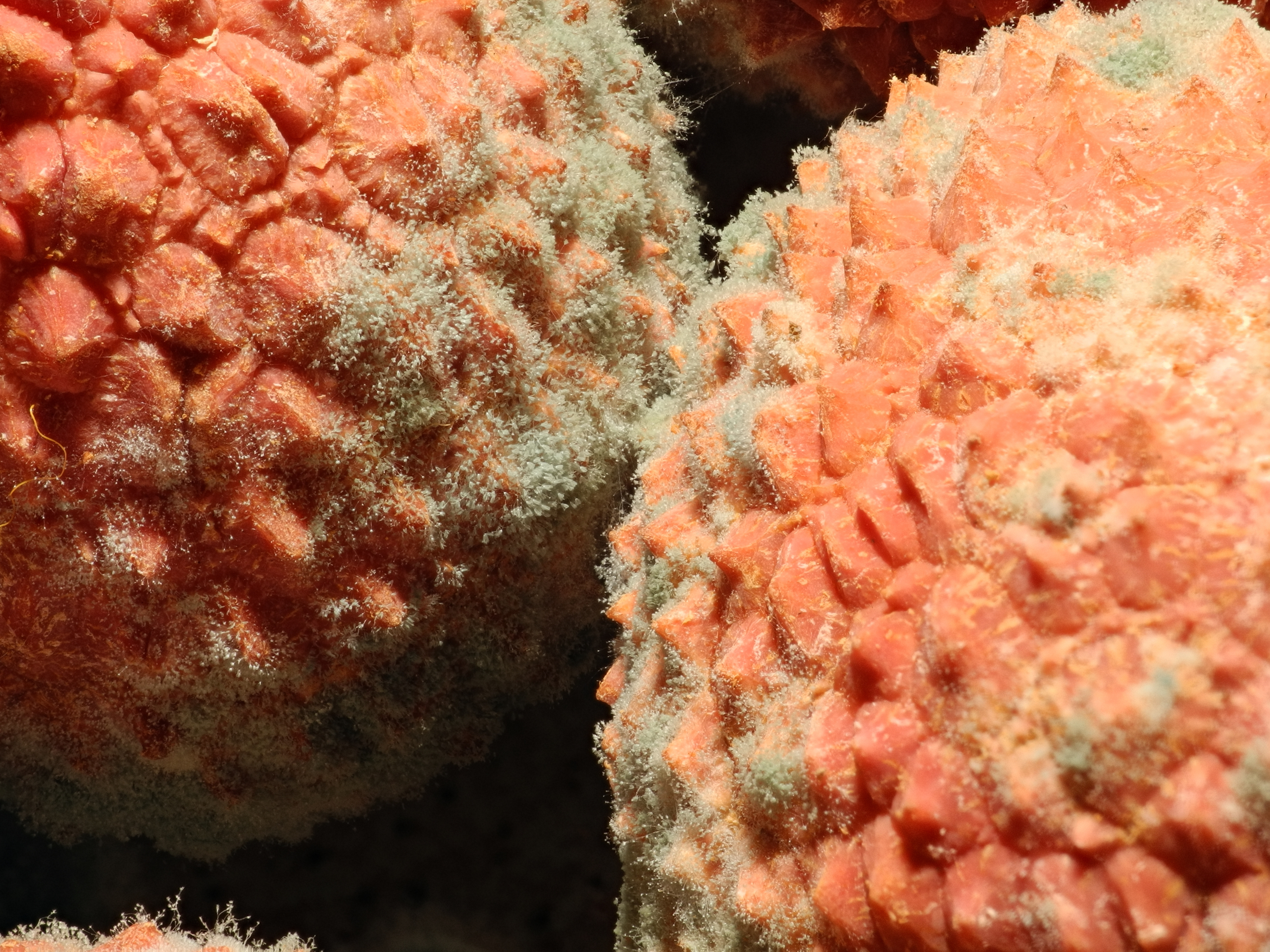
Mold on Litchi chinensis, stack of 20 frames

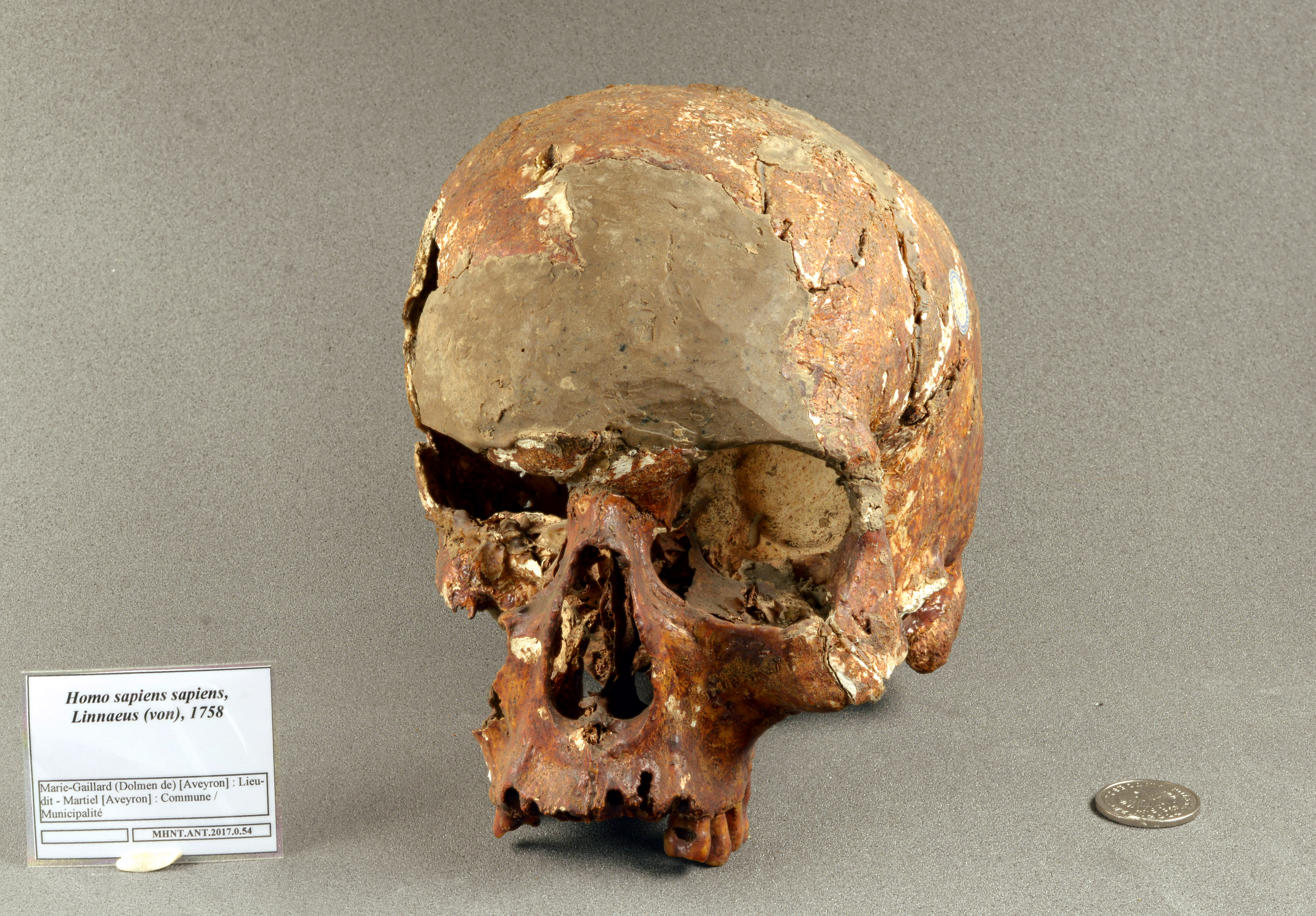
Skull, stack of 6 frames

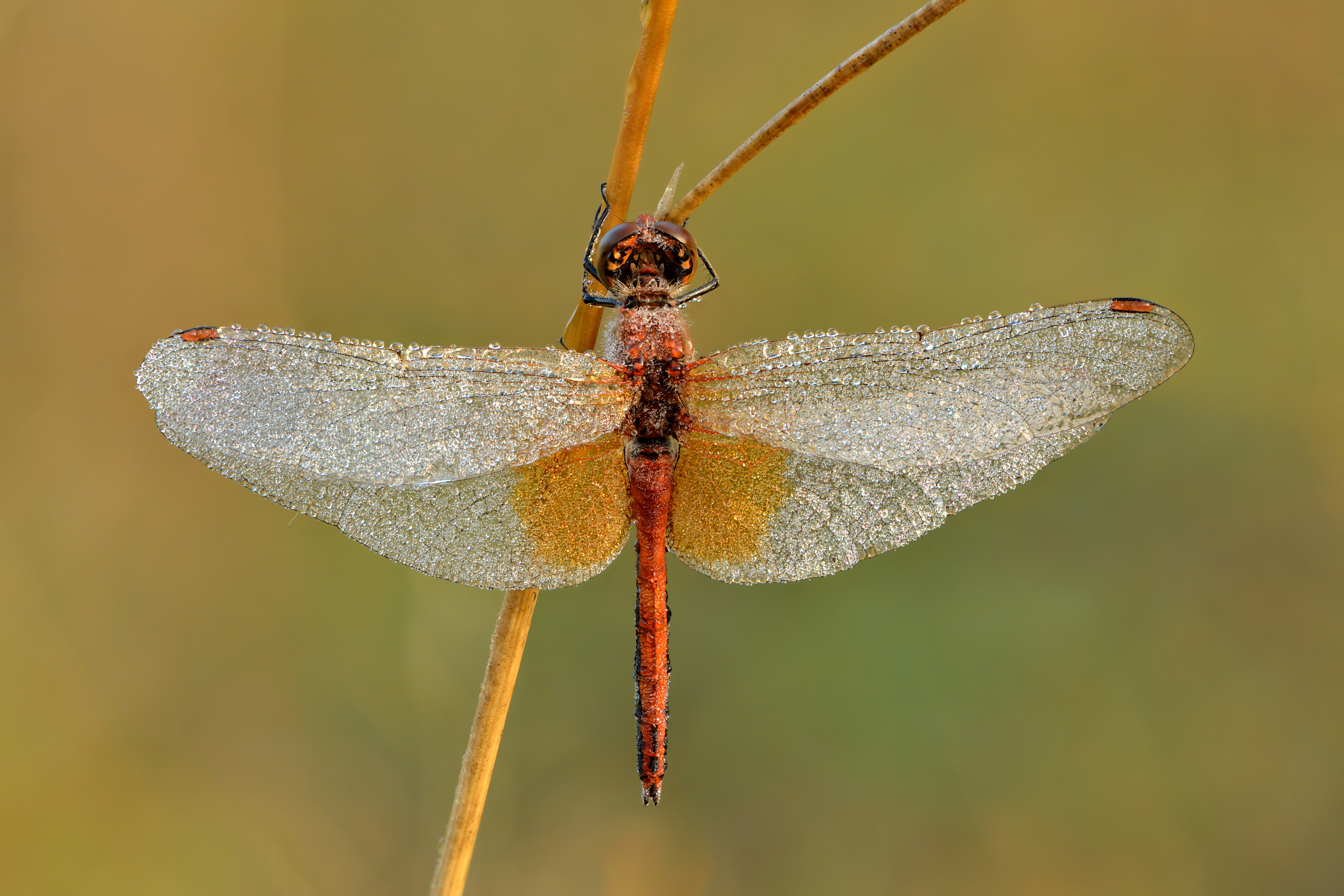
Sympetrum flaveolum male, stack of 36 frames

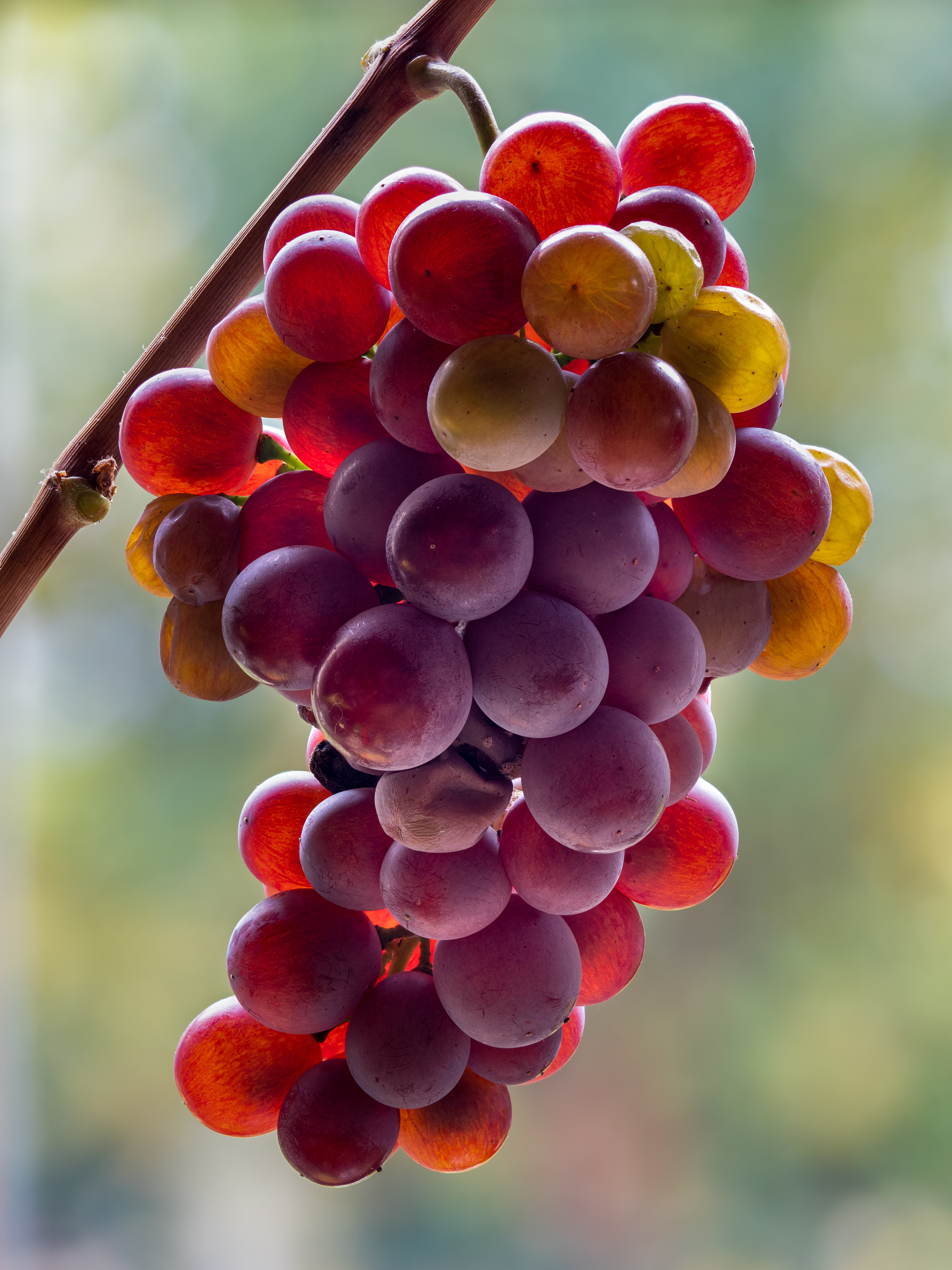
Pinot Gris grape, stack of 12 frames.

=== Videos ===
Focus stacking images of a lily

Focus stacking images of a microchip

=== Diagrams ===
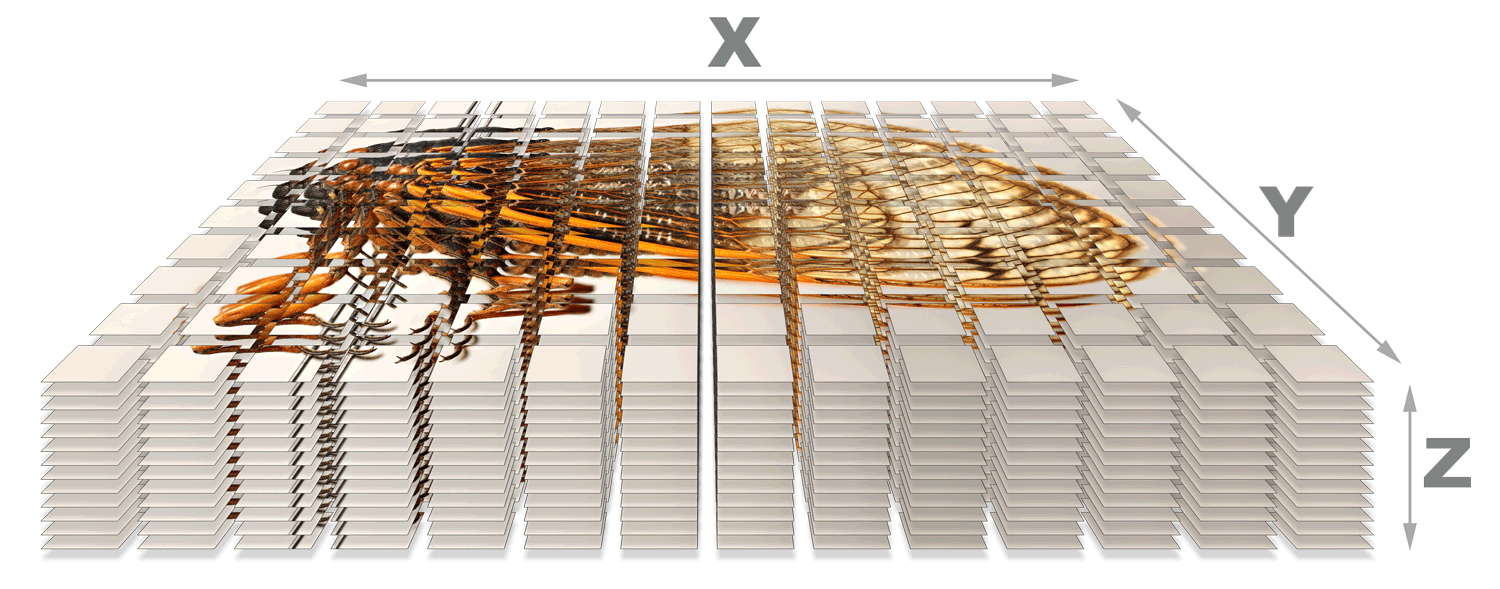
Software creates from the sharpest areas in a stack of sections.

== See also ==
- Brenizer method
- Deep focus
- Epsilon photography
- Focus bracketing
- Frazier lens
- High dynamic range
- Image fusion
- Image stitching
- Microscopy § Deconvolution
- Shift-and-add for stacking astrophotos
