= CombineZ =

Free image-processing software package

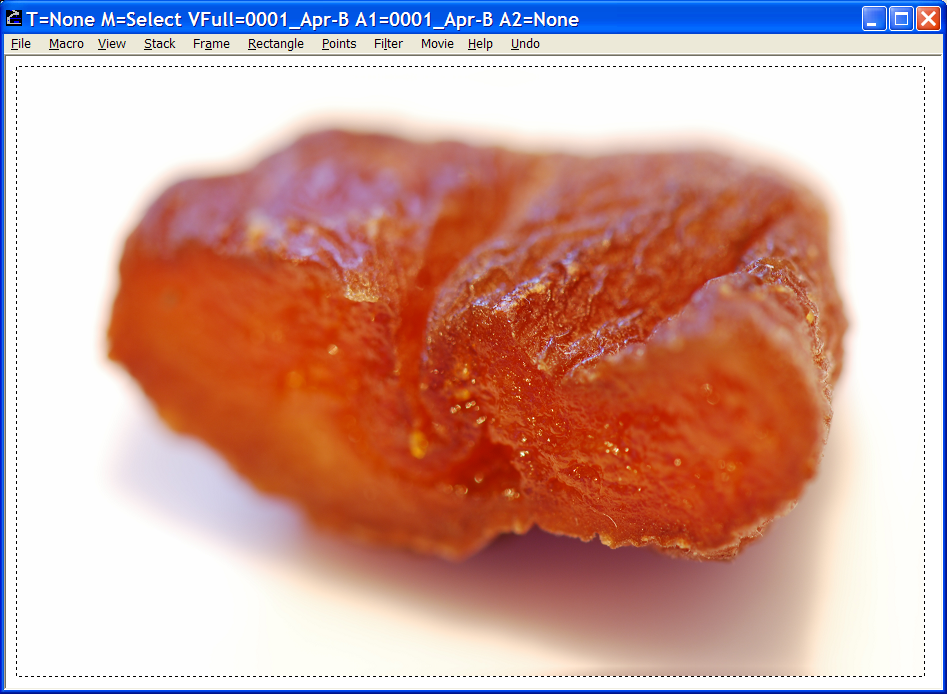
- CombineZM running on Windows XP
- Developer(s): Alan Hadley
- Stable release: CombineZP / June 6, 2010; 15 years ago
- Operating system: Windows
- Type: Digital image processing
- License: GPL
- Website: hadleyweb.pwp.blueyonder.co.uk

CombineZ is free image-processing software package for creating images with extended depth of field. It runs on Microsoft Windows. The current release is CombineZP (CombineZ-Pyramid), successor to CombineZM (CombineZ-Movie) which was based on CombineZ5 (designed for older versions of Windows and is no longer maintained).

CombineZ processes a stack of images (or frames) and is most frequently used to blend the focused areas of several partially focused digital photographs, usually close-ups, in order to create a composite image with an extended depth of field, created from the in-focus areas of each image.

== Other uses ==
CombineZ has many image manipulation functions that can be used in modifying images (frames) or sets of sequential images (stacks). It can take videos and split them into individual frames which are then manipulated for focus stacking. Alternatively, it can convert a sequence of static frames into a movie (including generating intermediate transitional frames for smoothness) or a pseudo-3D 'rocker' image stack animation.

Animation that used image alignment features and transitional frames in an attempt to visualise changes over a period of 14 years

== Limitations ==
- Does not support 16 bit images
- Images must be in height order (closest to furthest, but can be flipped within the application)
- Supports a limited number of image and video formats
- Only runs on Microsoft Windows

== Gallery ==
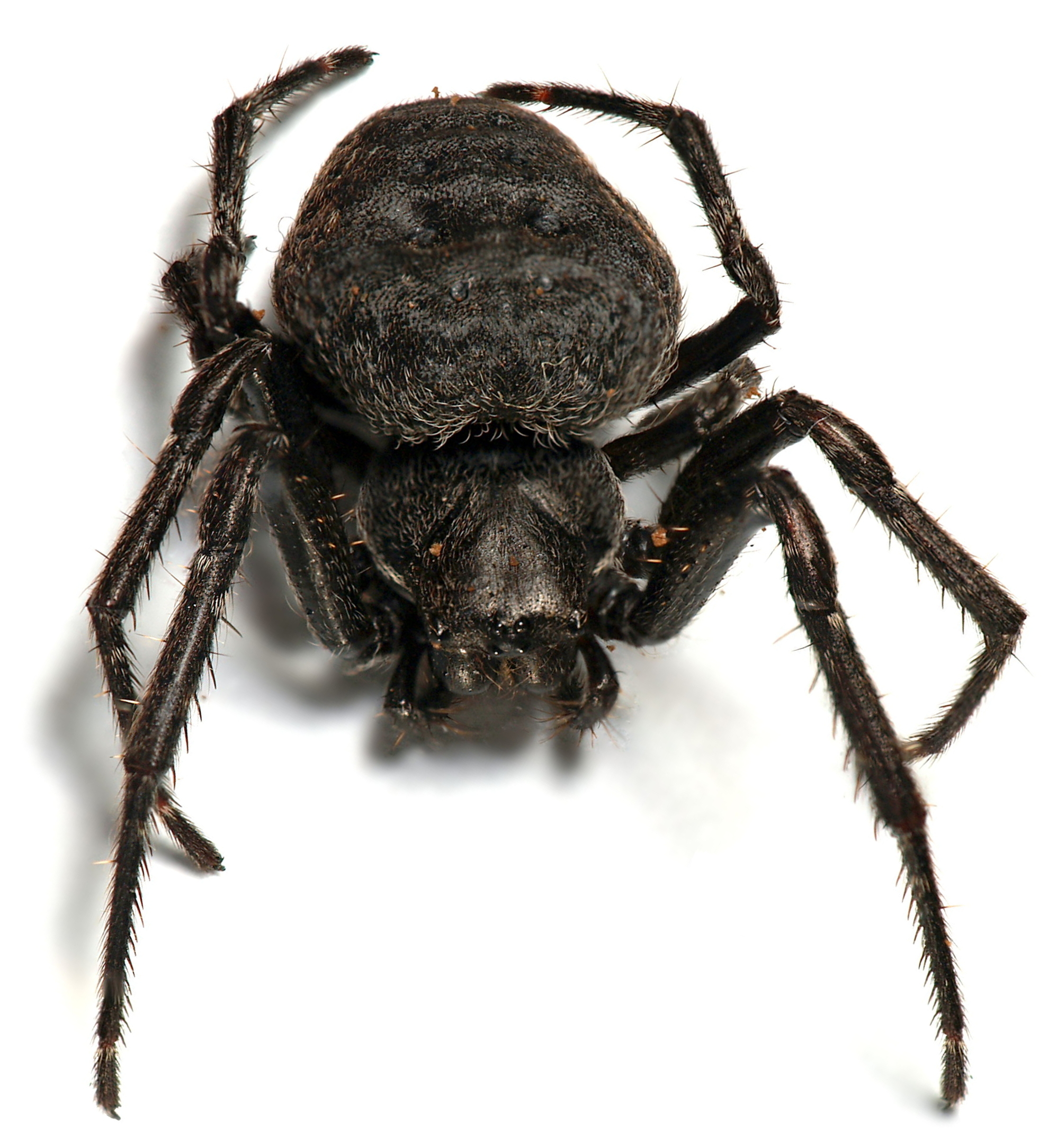
Macro image created with CombineZM. All parts of the spider are in focus.

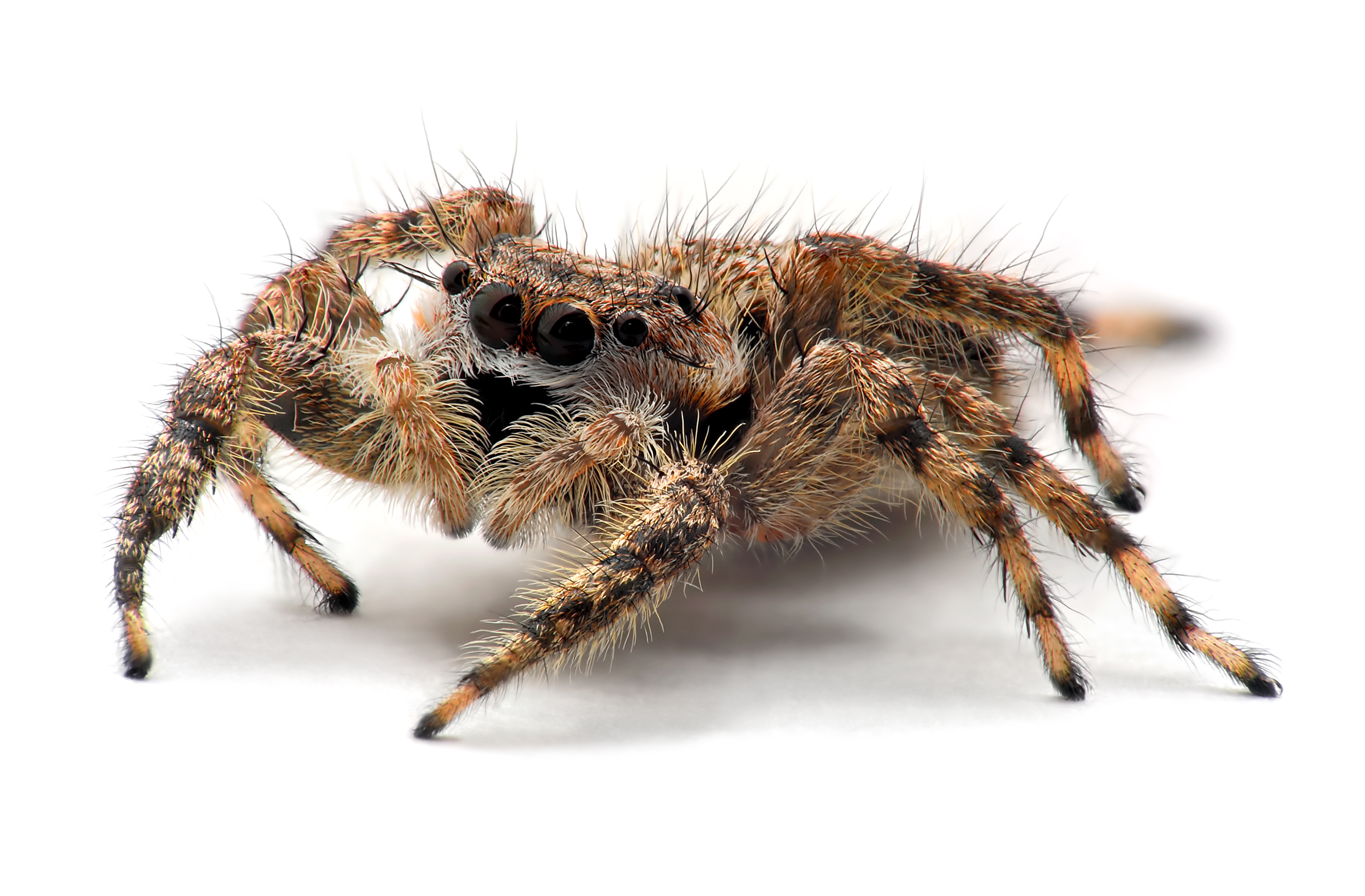
13 images were combined to create this image of a jumping spider.

Some images created with CombineZP and taken with a Nikon Coolpix P7000:

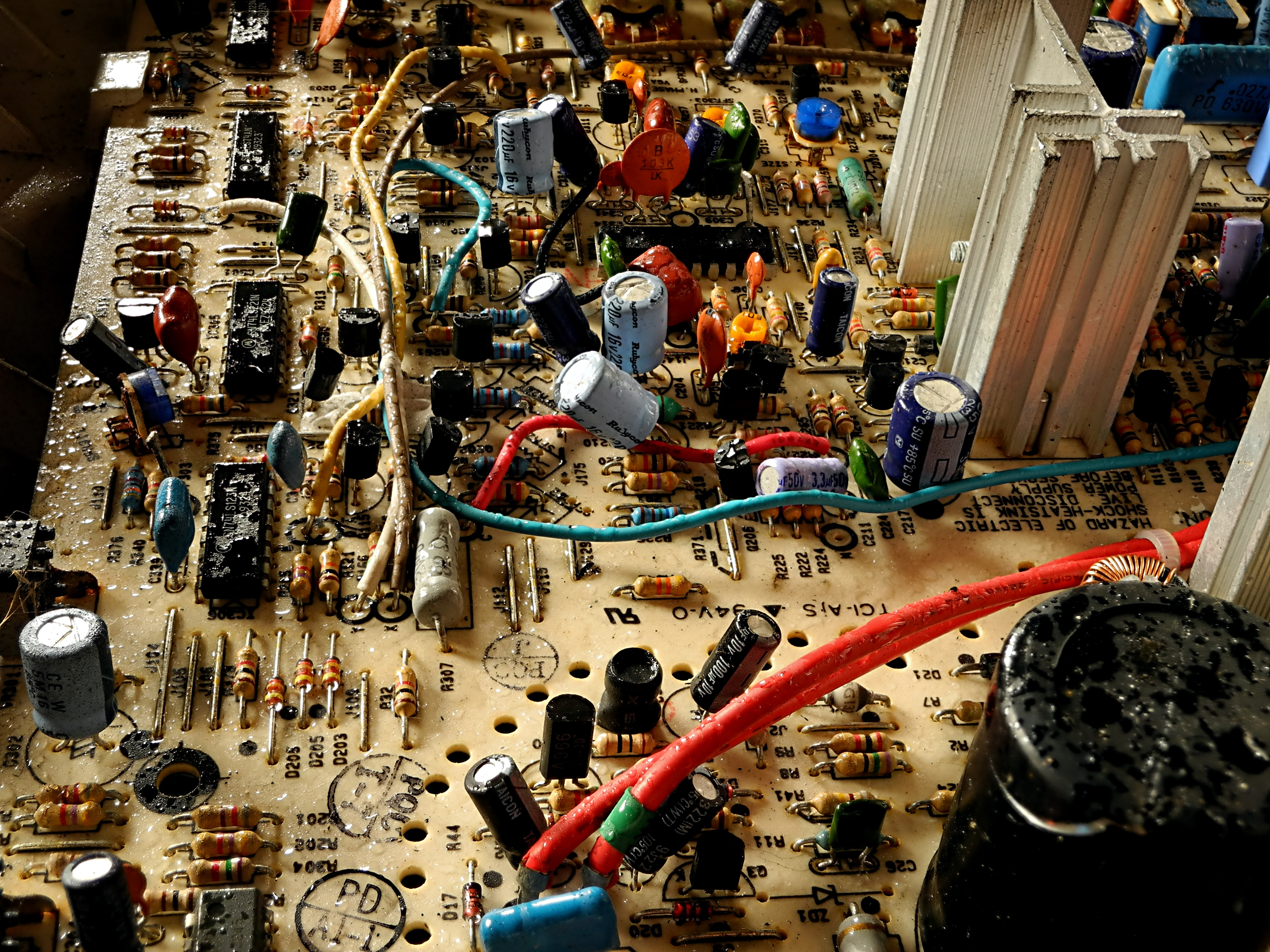
Electronic components

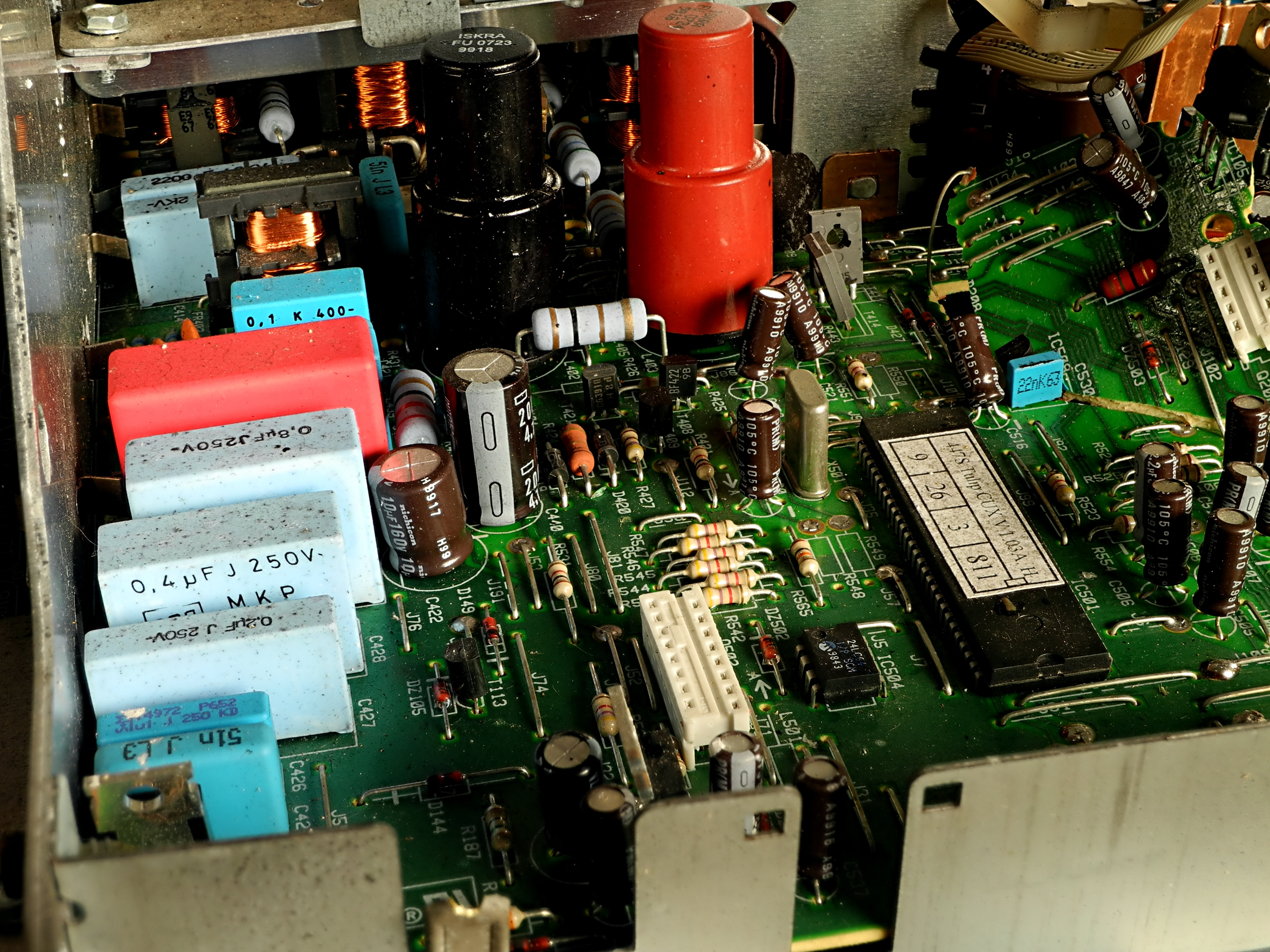
Electronic components

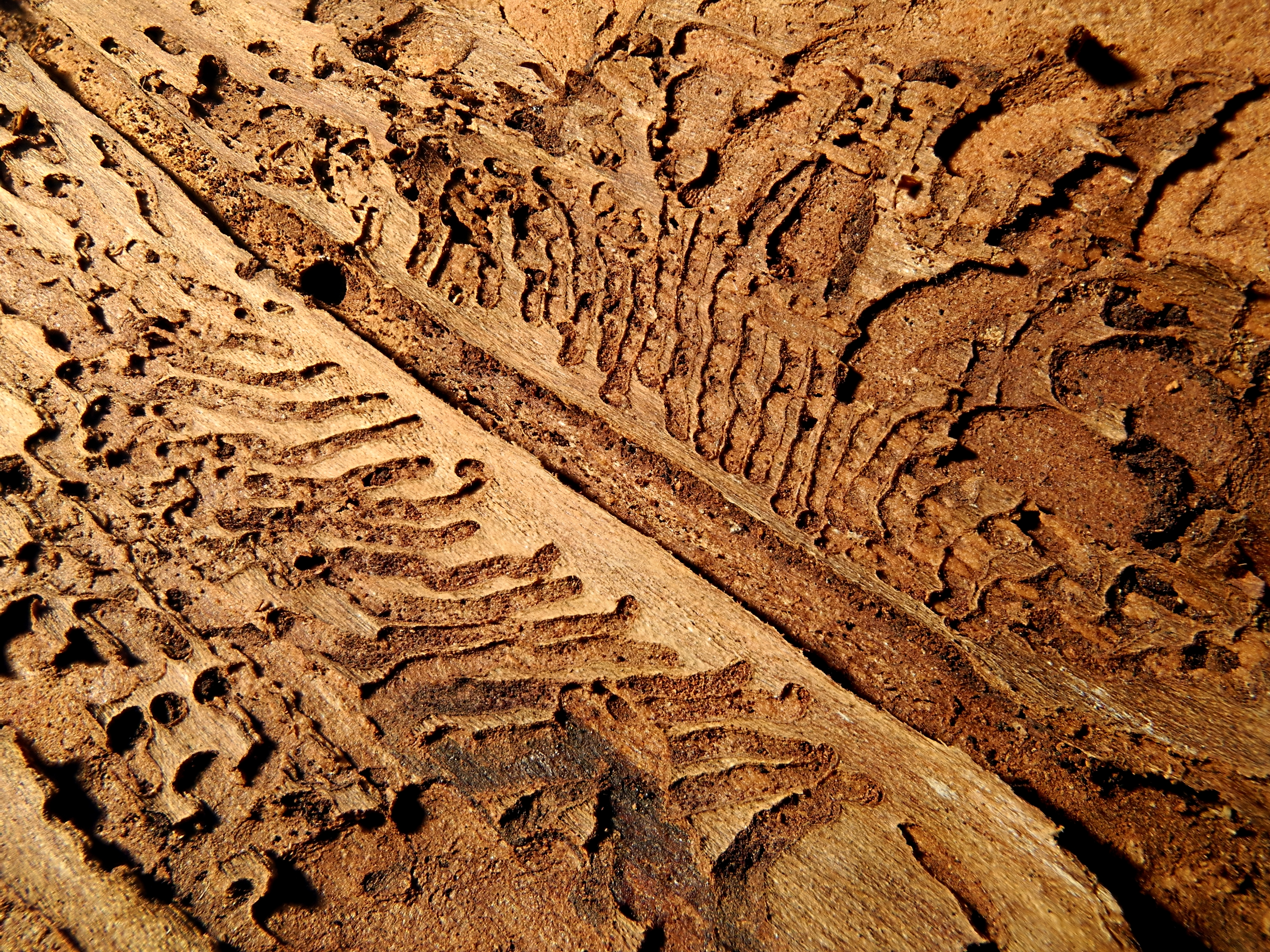
Bark with scolytinae sp. galleries

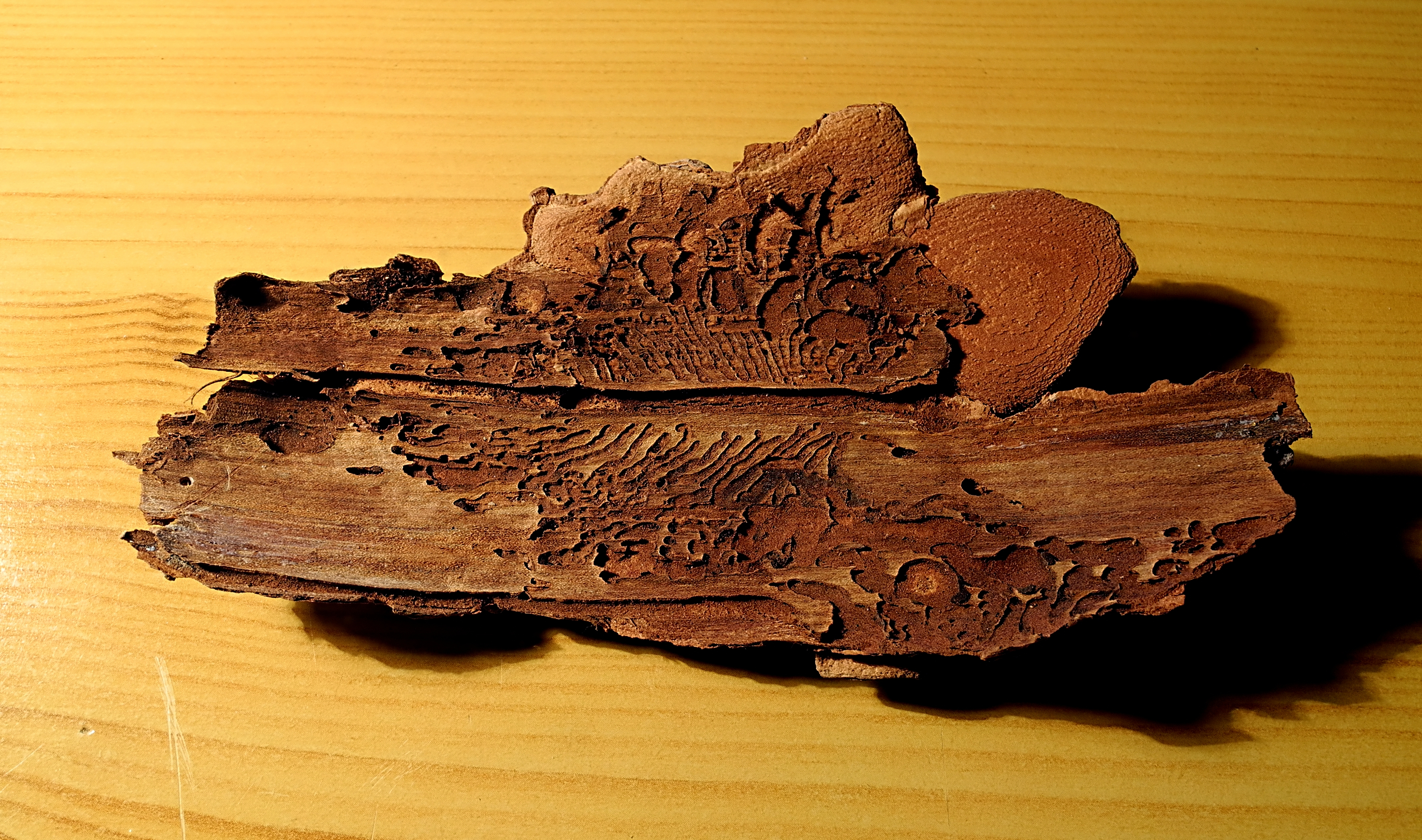
Bark with scolytinae sp. galleries

Some images created with CombineZM/CombineZP and taken with a Nikon D300 with a macro lens:

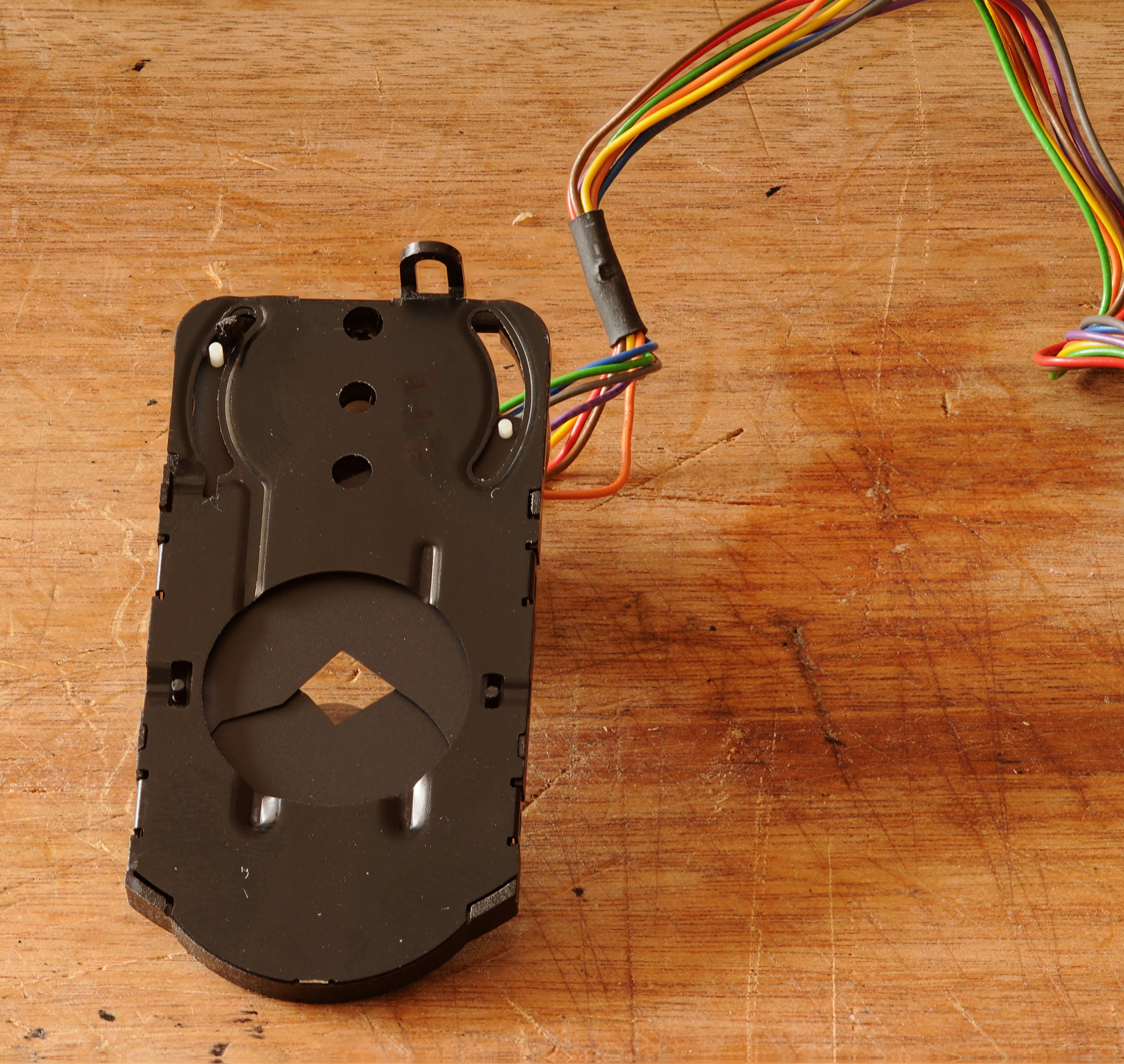
A diaphragm from an old videocamera

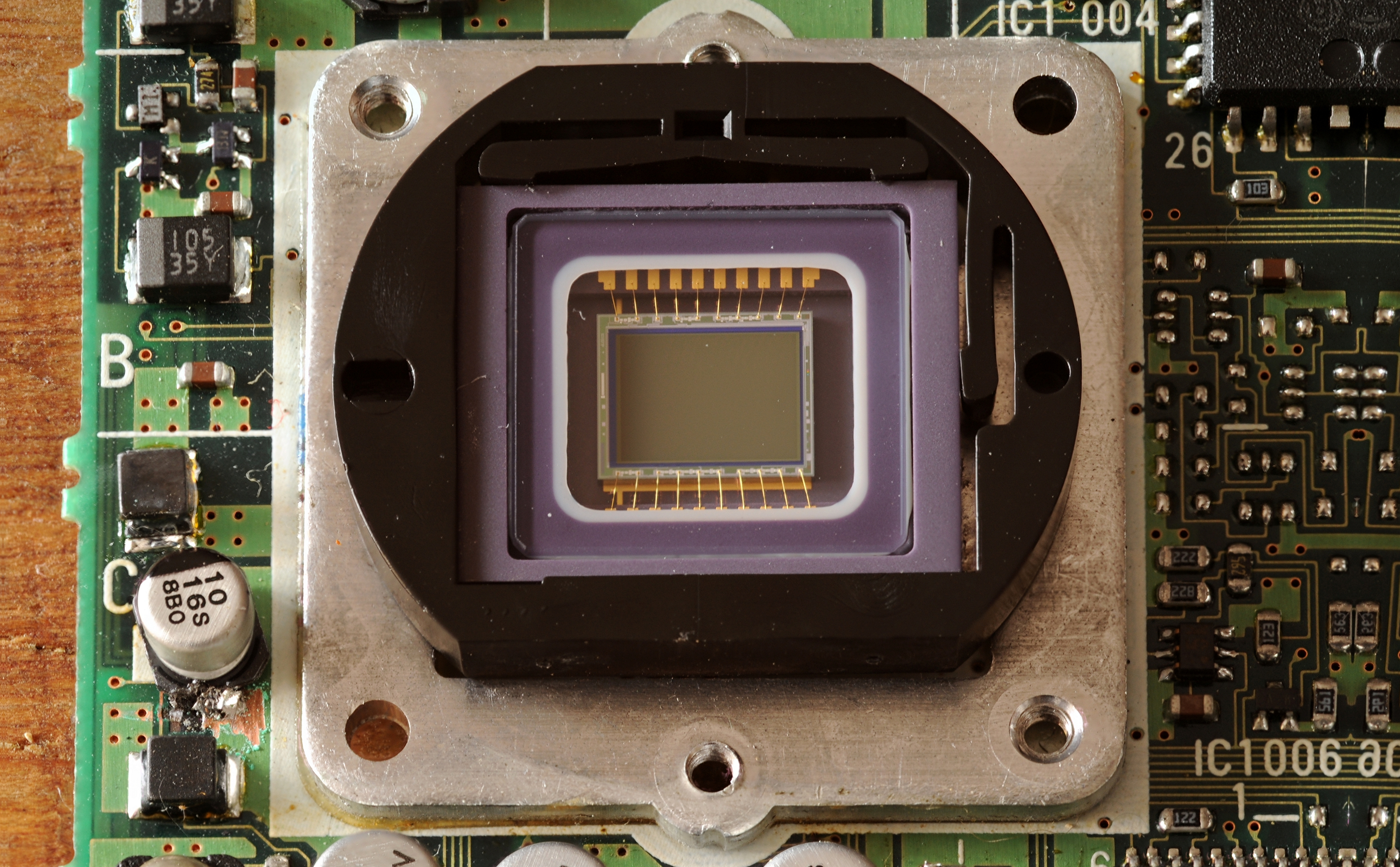
A sensor from an old videocamera

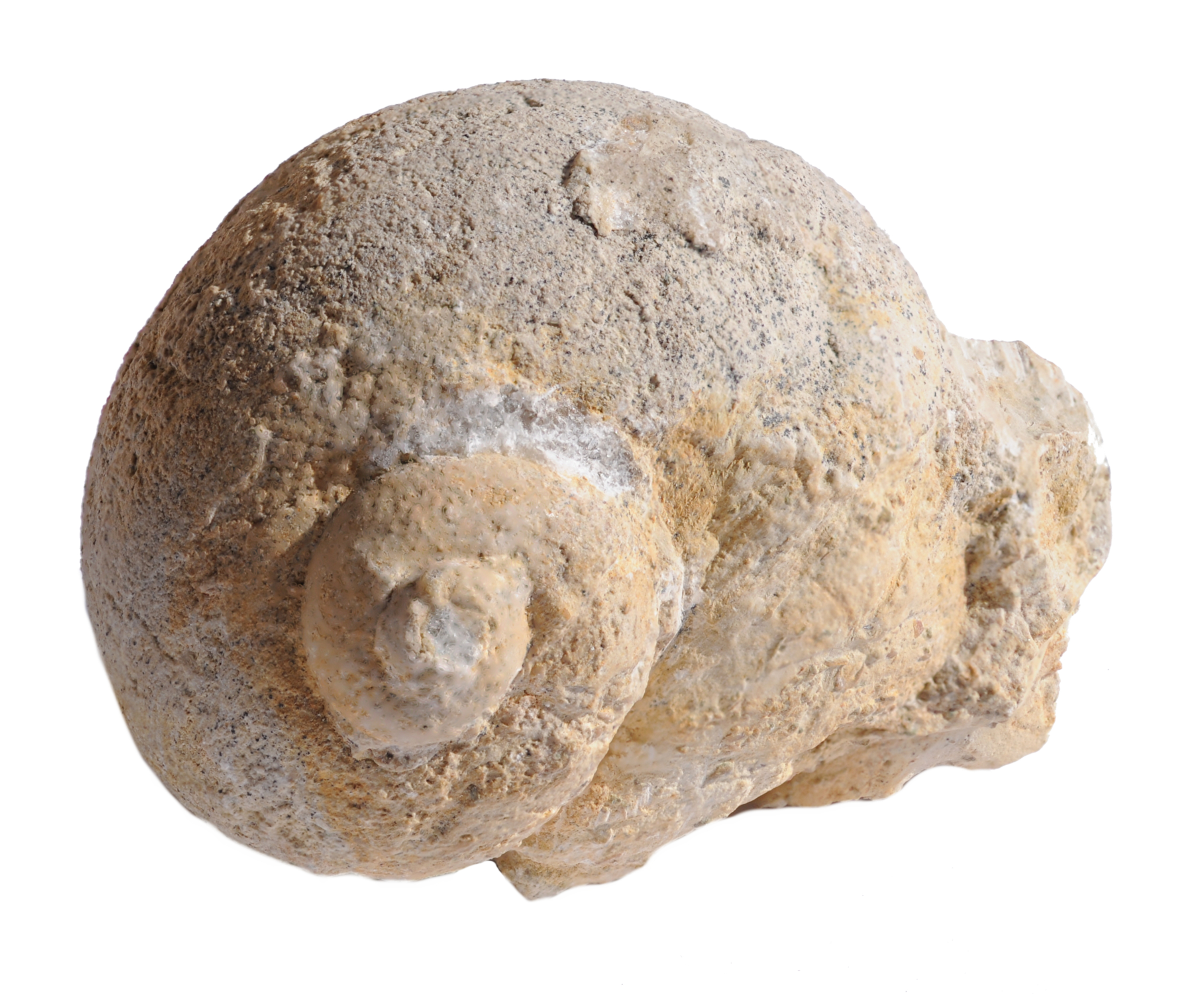
Fossil

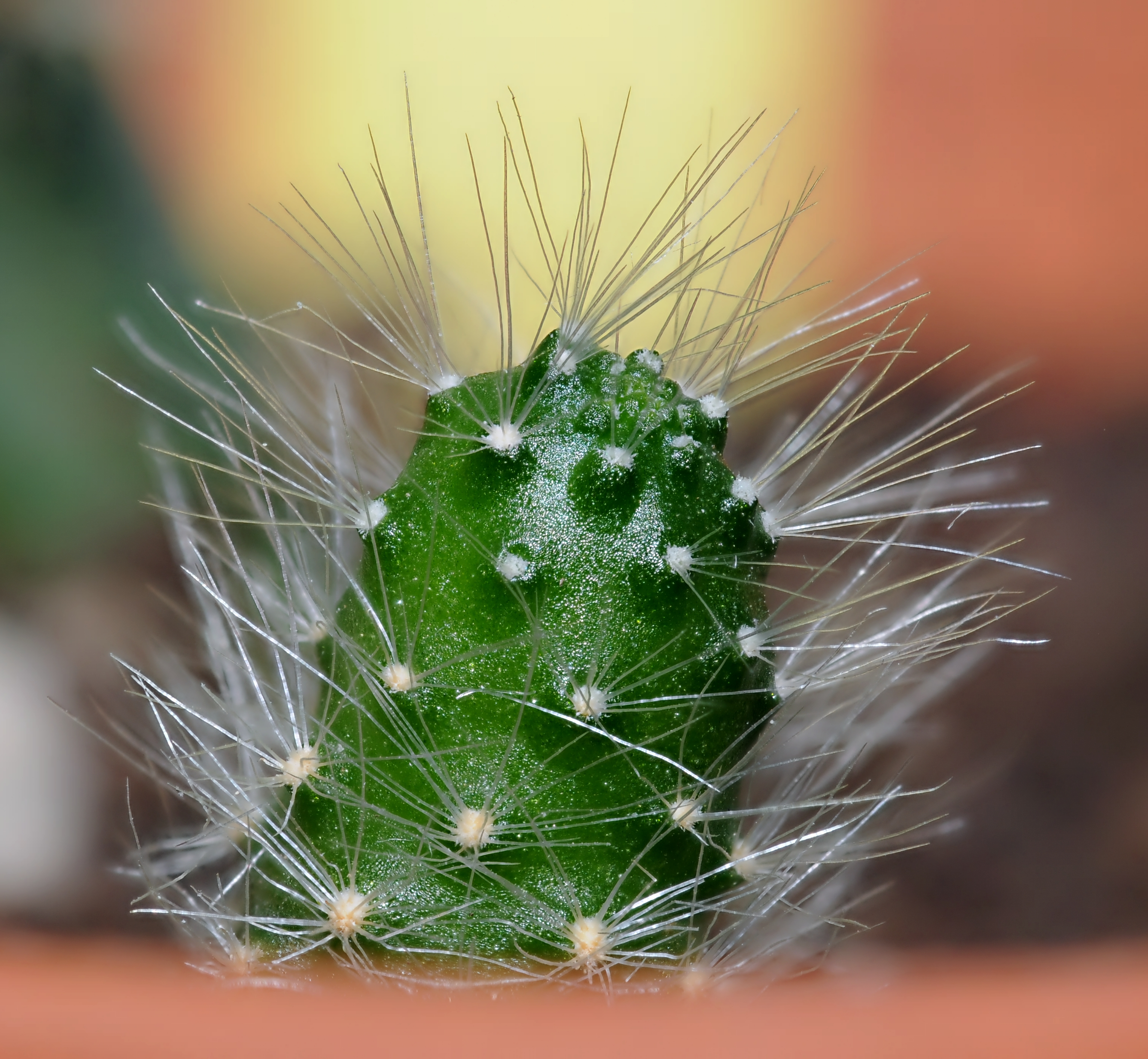
Rebutia minuscula

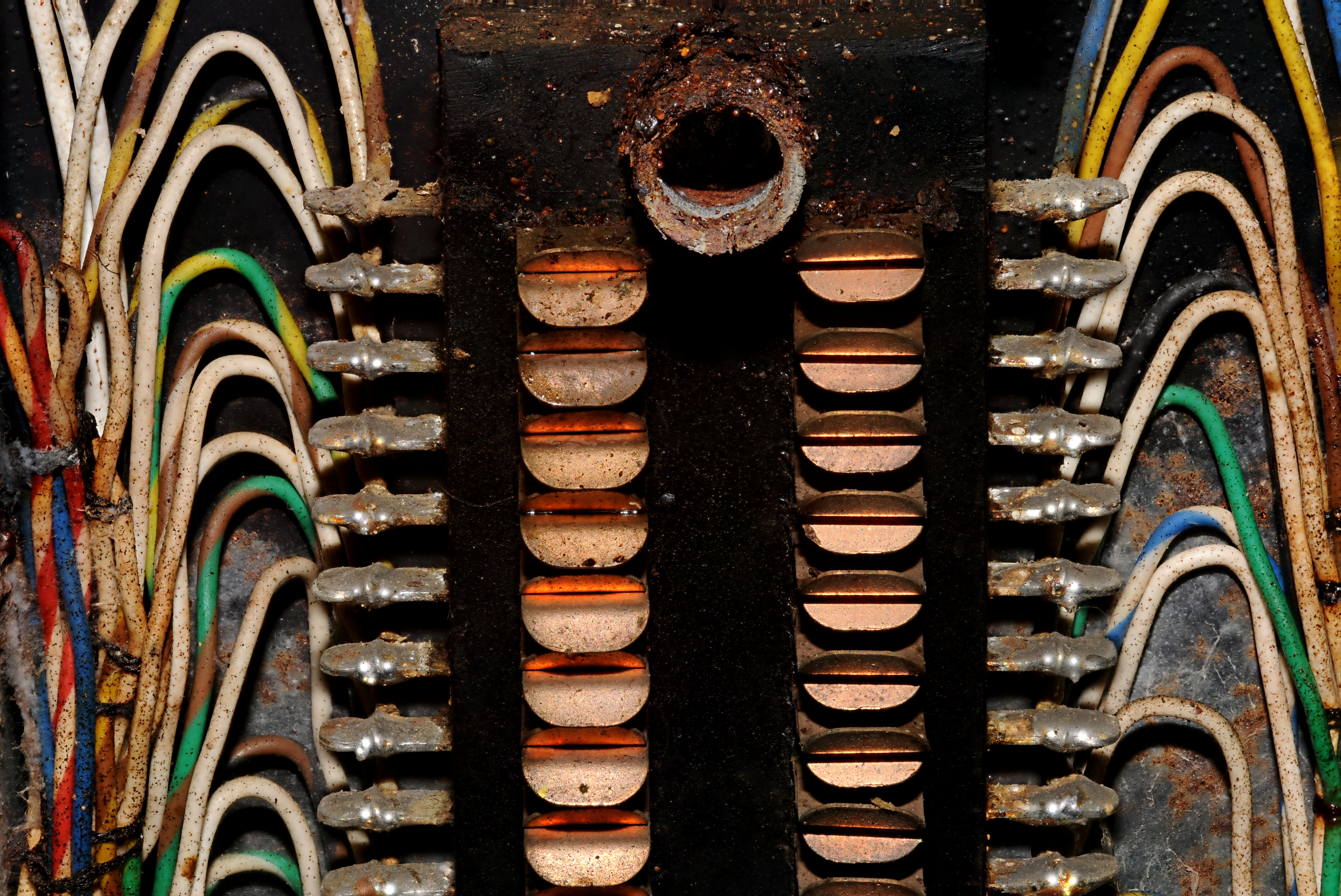
Electric device

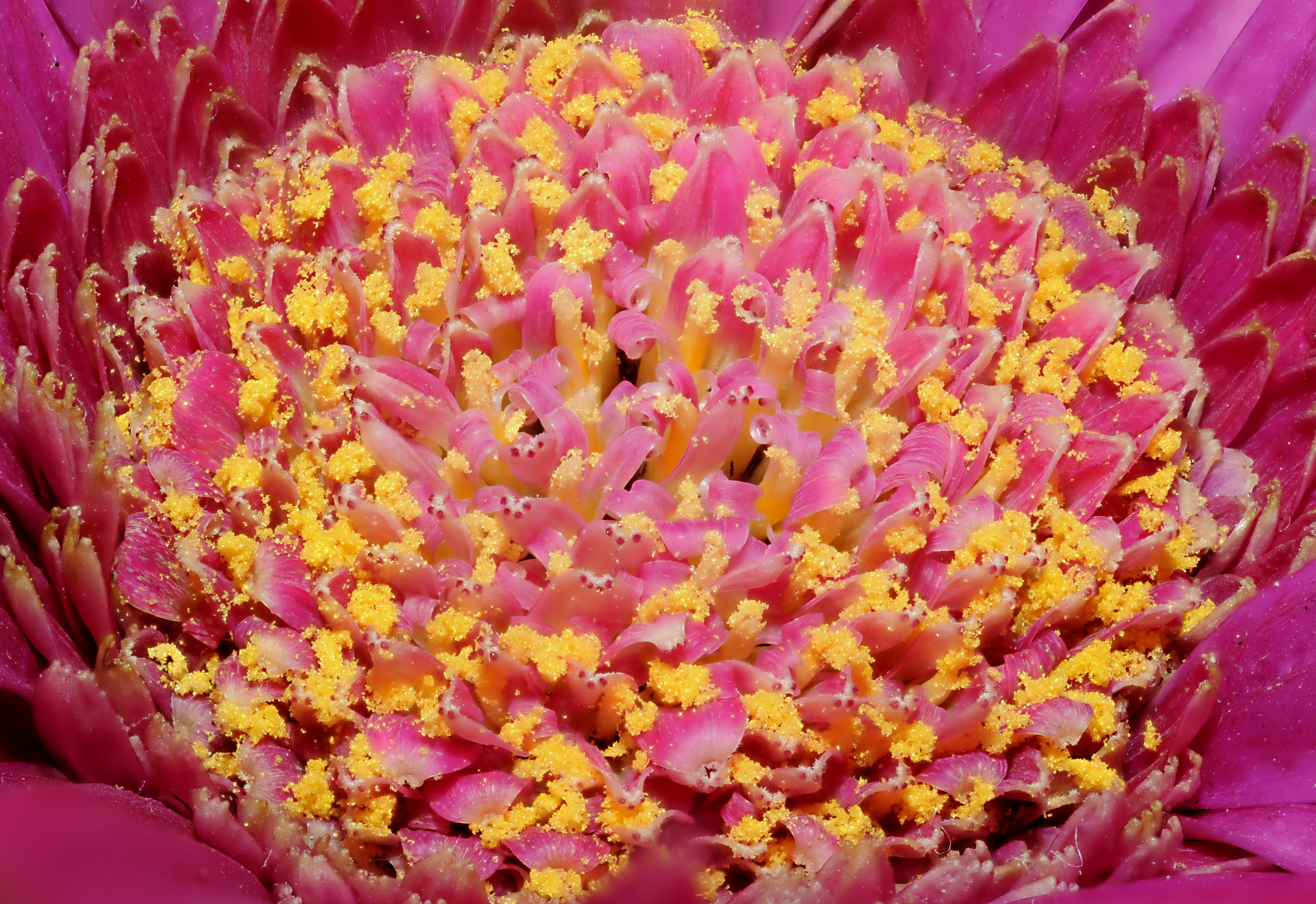
Asteraceae sp. flower

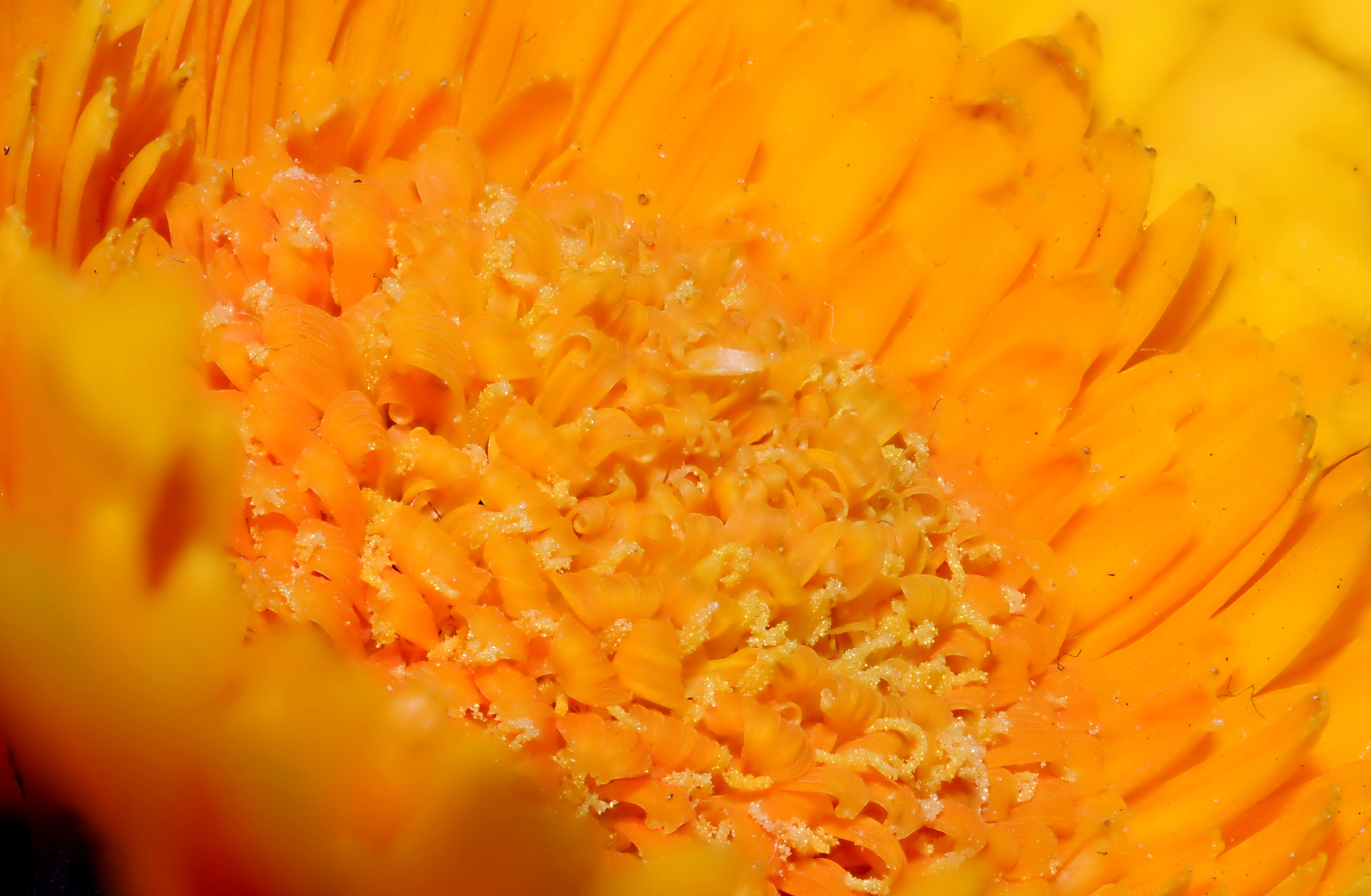
Asteraceae sp. flower
