= Olympus μ Tough =

Olympus μ Tough is a family of compact digital cameras from Olympus Corporation. Among the models in the family are the 12 megapixel μ Tough-3000 and μ Tough-8000 cameras. They are specified to be shock- and waterproof.

== See also ==
- Olympus Tough TG-4
- Olympus Tough TG-5
- Olympus Tough TG-6
- OM_System_Tough_TG-7
