= TG-5 =

TG-5 may refer to:

- TG5, Italian TV news program
- Aeronca TG-5, a three-seat 1942 training glider
- Olympus Tough TG-5, a weatherised digital compact camera announced by Olympus Corporation on May 17, 2017
