= Panasonic Lumix DC-S5 =

Panasonic LUMIX DC-S5
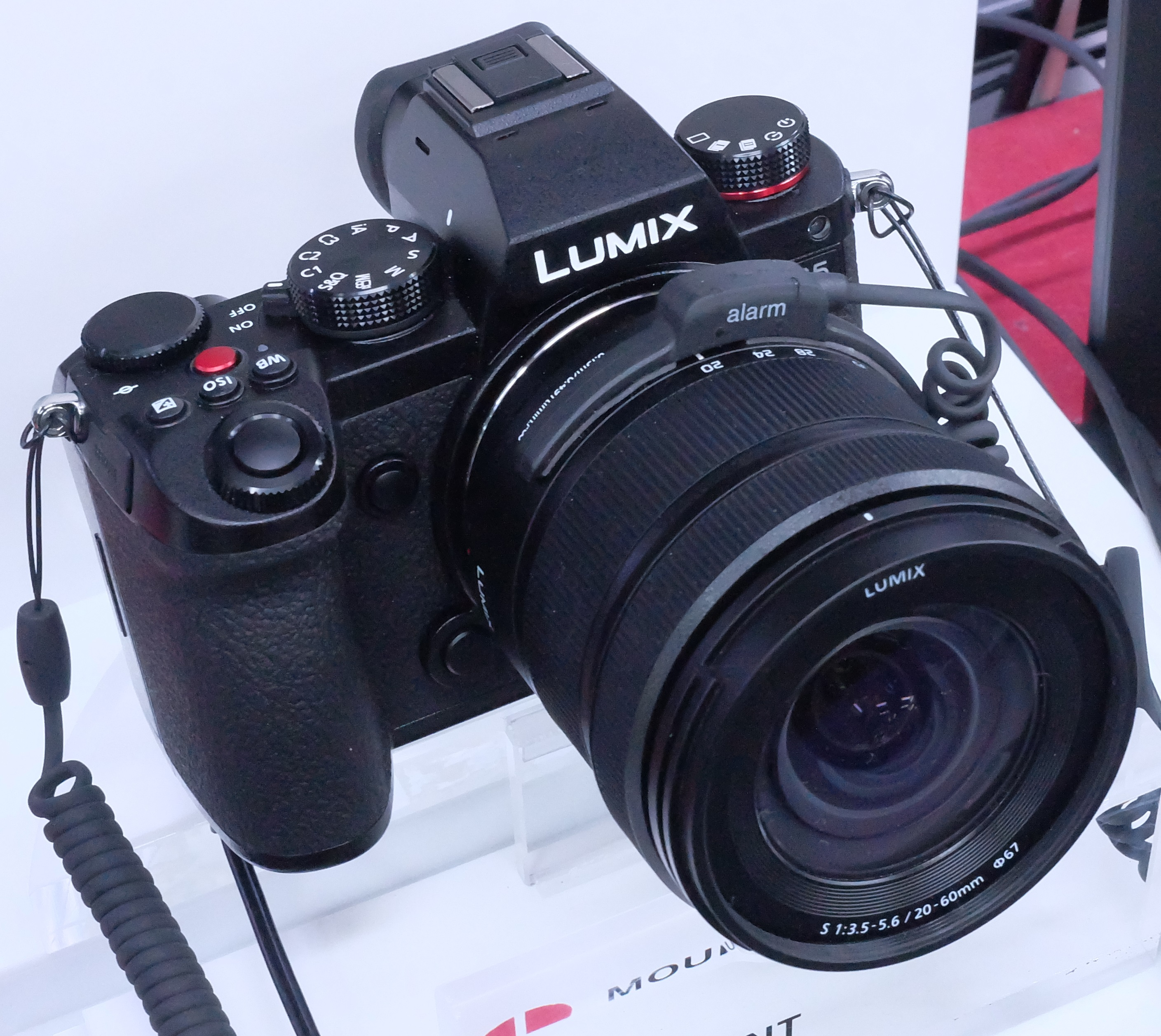
- Panasonic LUMIX S5 full frame mirrorless camera with a lens

Overview
- Maker: Panasonic Corporation
- Type: Mirrorless interchangeable-lens digital camera (full frame)
- Released: 25 September 2020; 5 years ago

Lens
- Lens mount: Leica L-Mount
- Lens: L-Mount system
- Compatible lenses: L-Mount lenses

Sensor/medium
- Sensor: 35mm full-frame
- Sensor type: 24.2 MP BSI CMOS (digital)
- Sensor size: 35.6 × 23.8 mm
- Sensor maker: Sony Semiconductor Manufucturing Corporation
- Maximum resolution: 6000 x 4000 (~24.2 MP)
- Recording medium: SD/SDHC/SDXC memory cards

Focusing
- Focus: Contrast-detect autofocus with Depth From Defocus
- Focus modes: AFS (Single), AFC (Continuous), MF
- Focus areas: 225-area, tracking
- Focus bracketing: Yes

Exposure/metering
- Exposure: 1728-zone metering
- Exposure bracketing: Yes
- Exposure modes: Program AE, Aperture Priority, Shutter Priority, Manual
- Metering modes: Multiple / Center-weighted / Spot / Highlight-weighted

Flash
- Flash: Hot shoe
- Flash exposure compensation: Yes
- Flash synchronization: Up to 1/250 sec
- Compatible flashes: external flashes

Shutter
- Frame rate: Up to 30 fps
- Shutter: Mechanical focal-plane shutter and electronic shutter
- Shutter speed range: Mechanical: approx. 60–1/8000 sec Electronic: up to 1/16,000 sec
- Continuous shooting: Up to 30 fps (electronic), up to 7 fps (mechanical)

Viewfinder
- Viewfinder: Electronic viewfinder (OLED)
- Viewfinder magnification: 0.74x
- Frame coverage: Approx. 100%

Image processing
- Image processor: Venus Engine
- White balance: Auto, Presets, Kelvin, Custom
- WB bracketing: Yes

General
- Video recording: 4K UHD (3840×2160) 60p/50p 4:2:0 10-bit; 4K UHD 30p/25p 4:2:2 10-bit internal; Full HD (1920×1080) up to 180 fps; 4K anamorphic modes; Unlimited 4K 30p/25p 8-bit recording
- LCD screen: 3.0-inch fully articulating touchscreen, 1.84M-dot resolution
- Battery: DMW-BLK22 rechargeable Li-ion battery USB-PD rechargeable
- Optional accessories: Battery grip, XLR microphone adapter, external flashes, remote shutter, L-Mount lenses
- AV port(s): HDMI Type-D (Micro HDMI), 3.5 mm mic jack and headphone jack
- Data port(s): USB-C, Wi-Fi, Bluetooth
- Body features: Magnesium alloy body, dust/splash resistant, IBIS
- Dimensions: 132.6×97.1×81.9 mm (5.22×3.82×3.22 in)
- Weight: 714 g (25 oz) (1.574 lb) (with battery and SD card)

Chronology
- Predecessor: LUMIX S1 series
- Successor: LUMIX S5II / S5IIX

The Panasonic LUMIX DC-S5 (also known as the LUMIX S5) is a digital, full frame mirrorless interchangeable-lens camera. It was released by Panasonic in September 2020 as part of the LUMIX S series. It uses a 24 MP BSI CMOS sensor and is designed as a hybrid model that includes features for both still photography and video. Many features of the S5 are similar to the more expensive LUMIX S1, including the sensor, its 5-axis in-body image stabilization system, and ability to shoot 96MP photos in high-res multi-shot mode. It also gives raw editing options which are useful for digital formatting. Despite being designed to be more compact with a smaller body, it included additional features in comparison to previous Panasonic cameras.

== Features ==
=== Video capabilities ===
The LUMIX S5 supports low contrast V-Log/V-Gamut recording and HDR video, with more than 14 stops of dynamic range that Panasonic claims is comparable to its dedicated cinema cameras. It also supports anamorphic capture, and its "S&Q" (Slow and Quick) mode supports variable frame rates, allowing capture rates from 1 fps to 180 fps which can be increased for fast-motion or decreased for slow motion video playback. It can record internal 4K video at up to 30p in 10-bit 4:2:2 using the full sensor width, or up to 60p in 10-bit 4:2:0 with an APS-C/Super35 crop, making it one of the first full-frame cameras in its price category to support internal 4K 50p and 60p recording. Many of the S5’s features and capture tools were inherited from the video-centric LUMIX S1H.

The S5 also supports external 4K/60p 10-bit 4:2:2 recording over HDMI and RAW video output compatibility with the Atomos Ninja V after a firmware update.

Catering to social media, the camera can record horizontally or vertically and automatically detects orientation for playback.

Though the S5 does not have a cooling fan, users have not reported overheating. In 8-bit, there is unlimited recording capability, unless limited by SD card capacity or battery life. In 10-bit, the recording is limited to 30 minutes per session.

=== Still photography features ===
The LUMIX S5 supports JPEG recording at 24, 12, or 6 megapixels, with selectable compression levels and optional RAW capture, although compressed RAW recording is not available. The camera also includes multiple aspect ratios, framing guides, and support for images with high dynamic range with playback on compatible displays.

The camera’s mechanical and electronic shutters both support shutter speeds from 1/8000 second to 60 seconds, along with Bulb mode for longer exposures.

The S5 also includes a "Pre-Burst" capture mode, which buffers one second of images while the shutter button is half-pressed, allowing the camera to save frames captured immediately before and after the shutter is fully pressed.

It also has a 96-megapixel High Resolution mode that uses sensor-shift stabilization to combine eight exposures into a single JPEG or RAW image with increased detail and reduced noise. The mode supports ISO settings up to 3200 and exposures up to 8 seconds per frame. This can be used for many subjects including astrophotography.

Additionally, the LUMIX S5 is the first full-frame Panasonic camera to have a Live View Composite mode that takes a series of images and adds light to any pixels that detect a change and updates the composite image on the live display. This is also helpful for astrophotography or light painting because it doesn’t overexpose areas like the night sky that remain constant.

=== Autofocus ===
The autofocus system of the S5 was updated with the latest deep learning technology available at its release for improved speed and precision. Panasonic’s Depth from Defocus (DFD) system for continuous autofocus was also updated to reduce wobbling in the viewfinder, an issue with earlier cameras. The system can track faces and eyes, and identify subjects.

The S5 supports shooting at up to 7 fps in single AF mode or 5 fps with continuous autofocus, and also includes Panasonic’s 4K and 6K Photo modes, which can create 8 MP or 18 MP JPEG images from high-speed video bursts at up to 60 fps.

=== Body ===
The LUMIX S5 was designed to be more compact than other Panasonic cameras at the time of its release. Its dimensions are approximately 133mm x 97mm x 82 mm and it weighs only 714g. The camera body has a magnesium alloy frame and is weather-sealed to provide dust and splash resistance.

The S5 retains much of the button and dial design of earlier Panasonic cameras, making it easy to transition between cameras. The Panasonic Lumix S5 features a customizable control layout with multiple physical dials, buttons, and touchscreen controls designed to provide direct access to frequently used camera settings, along with a large ergonomic grip for improved handling.

The camera has a 2.36-million-dot OLED electronic viewfinder with 0.74x magnification which can be set to refresh at 60 or 120fps. The LCD display is a three-inch vari-angle 1.8-million dot touchscreen that can flip and rotate and is useful for videographers working alone.

The S5 has dual SD card slots, with one supporting UHS-II and the other supporting UHS-I transfer speeds. Its modest burst speed doesn’t overly tax the cards, meaning it can record video to both cards simultaneously in any format including 4K/60p recording modes.

The S5 uses the DMW-BLK22 battery rated for 440 - 470 shots (LCD - EVF). Power-saving functions extend this up to 1500 shots per charge. It is chargeable via USB-C and can also be used with the DMW-BGS5 battery grip.

=== Image sensor ===
The S5 has a 24 megapixel, full frame BSI CMOS sensor. The camera has a standard sensitivity range up to 51,200, with dual native ISOs of 640 and 4,000 to reduce noise.

Like other LUMIX cameras, the S5 includes a built-in in-body image stabilization (IBIS) unit. Its five-axis system has up to 6.5 stops of stabilization when using it with a compatible lens.

=== Lenses ===
The S5 works with Leica L-Mount lenses. Like other LUMIX S bodies, this includes a wide range of lenses from Panasonic, Sigma, Leica, and more.

=== Connectivity and smart features ===
The S5 has ports for micro HDMI, USB-C, and 3.5mm microphone and headphone jacks. The USB-C port supports powering or charging the camera’s battery, tethering, and use as a webcam. A hot shoe supports on-camera accessories like an external flash. It can also connect to a microphone adapter allowing connection to an XLR audio equipment.

The S5 includes Bluetooth and Wi-Fi to connect with the LUMIX Sync app for one-touch wireless transfer or remote control from a smartphone, or to pair with other hardware.

At launch, the S5 supported external 4K recorders. However, a free firmware update in November 2020 enabled the S5 to output up to 5.9K Apple ProRes RAW video to the Atomos Ninja V recorder, adding higher-quality RAW recording and expanded monitoring capabilities.

=== Assist tools and features ===
The S5 has a wide range of video feature sets including monitoring tools like waveform. It also supports anamorphic recording modes for widescreen video capture that can be de-squeezed later during presentation. The S5 also includes full V-Log and HLG (Hybrid Log-Gamma) support for video and photography with expanded dynamic range.

=== Similar cameras ===
The LUMIX S5 shares many features with other Panasonic mirrorless cameras. It has the same sensor and IBIS system as the LUMIX S1, though it has a more compact body. It has also been described as a "full-frame GH5 or a mini-S1H." The S1H video features left out of the S5 are mostly related to the need for thermal management since the S5 lacks an inbuilt cooling fan. The S5 also has the same L-mount as the rest of the LUMIX S bodies.

The Sony α7 III, Nikon Z6II, and Canon EOS R6 are the S5's main competitors at similar price points.

== LUMIX S5D ==
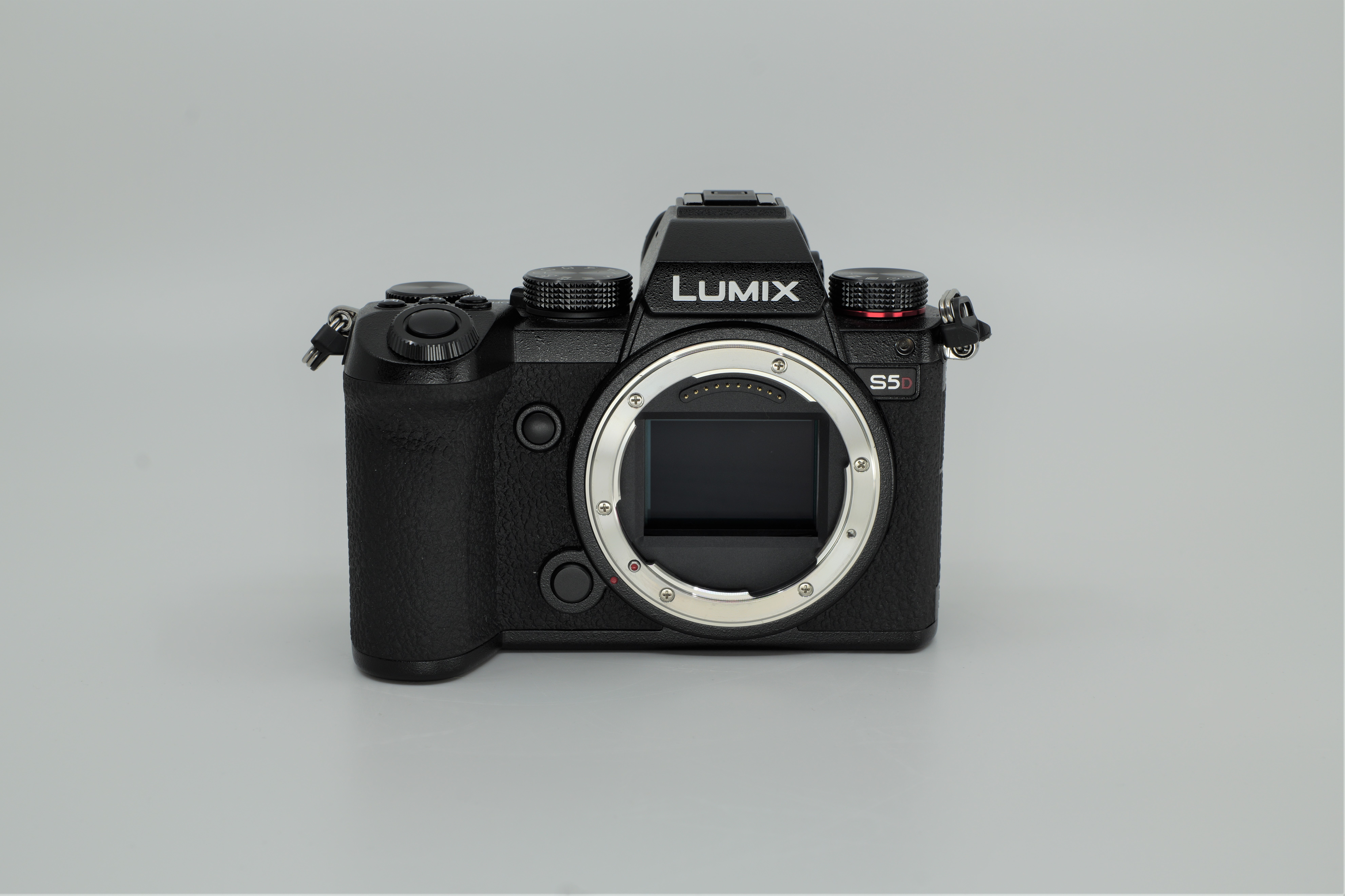
The Panasonic LUMIX S5D as seen from the front

The LUMIX DC-S5D is a variant of the LUMIX S5 that was released in 2024. The S5D added compatibility with DJI's LiDAR autofocus system and DJI RS 3 Pro Gimbal for autofocus. The LiDAR system has 43,200 ranging points and works within a 14 meter distance without the need for additional accessories or calibration. DC-S5D was not sold in Japan.

The S5D has Panasonic’s 5-axis IBIS system with up to 6.5 stops of stabilization. It also has the same sensor as the S5 and has dual native ISOs of 640 and 4000. For video, it has 4K 10-bit recording up to 30 minutes or 4k 8-bit recording with no limit. It can also connect to an Atomos external recorder.

Though the S5D was released after Panasonic’s phase-detect autofocus system, it shares the S5’s contrast-detect autofocus. The added LiDAR system can improve autofocus accuracy by providing focus feedback that provides precise distance measurements. This system also helps improve autofocus when shooting video in low light.

== Reception ==
The Panasonic Lumix S5 has been described as a good value full-frame hybrid camera aimed at enthusiast photographers and videographers, and as an affordable entry point into full-frame imaging that still has a variety of features.

Reviewers have highlighted its compact body and the number of features that are included for its relatively low price. Some appreciated features include the 24MP full-frame sensor, in-body image stabilization, 10-bit 4K video recording, high resolution mode, connectivity to the Ninja V, dual card slots, and weather-sealed body. The S5 won PCMag’s Editors' Choice Award for Best Full-Frame Camera in 2020.

However, some reviewers mentioned that the S5’s continuous tracking and video autofocus were weaker than competitors, and that burst shooting performance was modest. Other criticisms included that the camera only has an average viewfinder and a micro HDMI port instead of a full-size connection.
