= Olympus Tough TG-4 =

Overview
- Maker: Olympus Corporation

Lens
- Lens: 25-100mm equivalent
- F-numbers: f/2.0-f/4.9 at the widest

Sensor/medium
- Sensor type: BSI-CMOS
- Sensor size: 6.17 x 4.55mm (1/2.3 inch type)
- Maximum resolution: 4608 x 3456 (16 megapixels)
- Film speed: 100-6400
- Recording medium: SD, SDHC, or SDXC memory card; internal memory

Shutter
- Shutter speeds: 1/2000s to 4s
- Continuous shooting: 5 frames per second

Viewfinder
- Viewfinder magnification: 8x Optical zoom (4x in iAuto, Scene and Underwater mode)

Image processing
- Image processor: TruePic VII
- White balance: Yes

General
- LCD screen: 3 inches with 460,000 dots
- Battery: LI-92B Li-ion battery
- Dimensions: 112 x 66 x 31mm (4.41 x 2.6 x 1.22 inches)
- Weight: 247 g (9 oz) including battery

The Olympus Tough TG-4 is a weatherised digital compact camera announced by Olympus Corporation on April 13, 2015. It differs from its predecessor, the Olympus Tough TG-3, by including raw image recording.

Other than its new RAW capability, the TG-4 is technically very similar to the Olympus TG-3. The physical dimensions (length x width x depth) of the TG-3 and the TG-4 are identical. The camera uses a non-standard, proprietary, USB-cable called CB-USB8.

In 2015, for the USA market, the MSRP for the older TG-3 is listed at $349 vs. $379 for the newer TG-4. The camera was superseded by the Olympus Tough TG-5 in May 2017.

== See also ==
- Olympus μ Tough
