= Sony α9 III =

2023 full-frame mirrorless camera

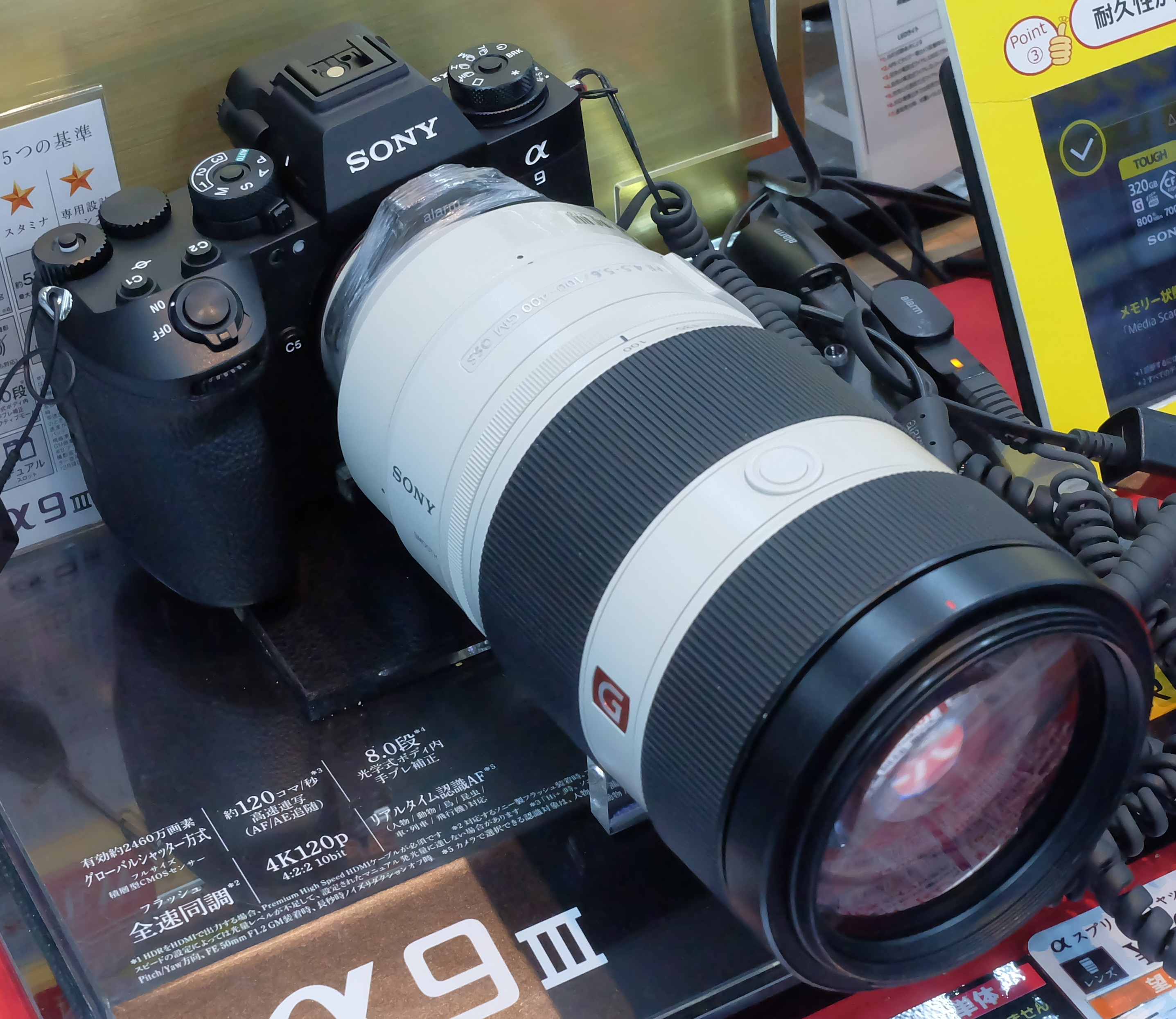

Overview
- Maker: Sony
- Type: Full-frame mirrorless interchangeable-lens camera
- Released: Spring 2024
- Intro price: $5,999 USD (body only) $8,299 CAN £6,099 GBP; 6,999€ EUR; 904,500 JPY

Lens
- Lens mount: Sony E-mount

Sensor/medium
- Sensor: Sony Exmor RS
- Sensor type: CMOS sensor with global shutter
- Sensor size: 35.6×23.8 mm (full frame)
- Maximum resolution: 6000×4000 (3:2) (24.6 megapixels)
- Film speed: ISO 250–25600 (expandable to ISO 125–51200) (still images)
- Recording medium: Dual multi slots: SDXC (UHS-II compatible) & CFexpress 2.0 Type A

Focusing
- Focus: Hybrid phase-detection / contrast-detection autofocus
- Focus areas: 759 phase-detection points, 96% coverage (still images); 627 phase-detection points points (video)

Flash
- Flash: No built-in flash
- Flash exposure compensation: +/- 3.0 EV
- Flash synchronization: 1/80000s
- Compatible flashes: Multi Interface Shoe-compatible flash systems, PC-sync flash systems

Shutter
- Shutter: Global electronic shutter
- Shutter speed range: 30s – 1/80000s
- Continuous shooting: Up to 120 fps (full-resolution JPG and/or 14-bit RAW output)

Viewfinder
- Electronic viewfinder: 1.6 cm (0.64 in) Quad-XGA (2048×1536) OLED, 9.44M dot, up to 240 Hz (full resolution up to 120 Hz)
- Viewfinder magnification: 0.9×

Image processing
- Image processor: BIONZ XR

General
- Video recording: Up to 3840×2160 at 120 fps (200 Mbps)
- LCD screen: 8.0 cm (3.1 in) TFT LCD; tilt-and-articulating
- Battery: NP-FZ100 Lithium-Ion rechargeable battery
- Optional accessories: VG-C5 Vertical Grip
- AV port(s): HDMI 1.4 (up to 3840×2160 at 30 fps), Multi Interface Shoe, 3.5mm jack (headphone and mic terminals)
- Data port(s): USB-C (5 Gbps), Multi / Micro USB, Gigabit Ethernet, 802.11ac Wi-Fi (dual band 2.4/5 GHz, 2×2 MIMO), Bluetooth 5.0
- Body features: 5-axis In-body image stabilization (8 stops), water and dust sealing
- Dimensions: 136.1 mm × 96.9 mm × 82.9 mm (5.36 in × 3.81 in × 3.26 in) (approximate)
- Weight: 702 g (1 lb 8.8 oz) (with battery and memory card)

Chronology
- Predecessor: Sony α9 II

The Sony α9 III (model ILCE-9M3) is a professional full-frame mirrorless interchangeable-lens camera produced by Sony. It is the first full-frame camera to use a global shutter; an image sensor that features no rolling shutter. The camera was announced by Sony on 7 November 2023, alongside the Sony FE 300mm f/2.8 GM OSS prime telephoto lens. It was released in the spring of 2024.

== Overview ==
The α9 III features an image sensor with a global shutter, the first full-frame camera to feature one. This enables it to take still images and videos without any rolling shutter. It also enables it to sync to flashes at any shutter speed, up to its maximum shutter speed of 1/80000 second. This is in contrast to mechanical or electronic rolling shutters that have a longer minimum flash sync speed than the camera's minimum shutter speed. However, due to the increased circuitry required, global shutter sensors do not typically perform as well as rolling shutter sensors in low light performance and dynamic range. The α9 III has a base ISO speed of 250, higher than the α9 II's base ISO speed of 100.

The α9 III can shoot 14-bit RAW image format pictures at 120 fps, with real time autofocus and a 192-photo buffer. It also features functionality to pre-capture a second of photos before the shutter is fully pressed, and a button to temporarily boost image burst rate while shooting. It can shoot video at 4K resolution at up to 120 fps without a sensor crop. It has a 9.44 million dot viewfinder with a 0.9× magnification, the same as the one in the Sony α7R V. It also features the same 2 million dot tilt-and-articulating rear screen in the α7R V, as well as a "dedicated AI co-processing unit" for autofocus subject recognition.

An optional battery grip was announced alongside the α9 III, the VG-C5. Sony claims that grip battery performance was improved by 15% by discharging its two batteries simultaneously instead of one at a time.

The α9 III was announced with a retail price of $6,000 USD, $1,500 higher than the α9 II.

== History ==
The α9 III was announced at Sony's Creative Space 2023 event on 7 November in New York City, following the 10-year anniversary of Sony's first full-frame mirrorless camera, the Sony α7. It was announced together with the Sony FE 300mm f/2.8 GM OSS prime telephoto lens. Sony gave reviewers an opportunity to test the camera at the indoor Chelsea Piers fitness center.

It is planned to release in Spring 2024. Photo equipment retailers list estimated ship or availability dates from 23 February to 28 February 2024.

== Reception ==
Pre-release reception was positive. Chris Niccolls of PetaPixel wrote that "There have only been a few times in my reviewing career where I would, in all seriousness, call something an actual game-changer. This is certainly one of those moments." He praised the camera's fast shutter speed and its ability to use flash or strobe lights without limitation, predicting that it would "make quite a splash at the upcoming 2024 Olympic Games". He called it "the most incredible sports camera I've ever used", praising the ability of the camera's autofocus system to keep up with high burst rates, despite encountering some hiccups.

Jason Vinson of Fstoppers similarly praised the camera's flash sync capability and burst image features, while noting there was an "added hassle" to syncing third-party flash systems at higher shutter speeds.

While received positively overall, journalists expressed reservations at various elements of the camera ahead of its release. Niccolls noted the camera's base ISO of 250, and wrote that its impact couldn't be evaluated until RAW files could be analyzed at release. Jaron Schneider of PetaPixel criticized the lack of CFexpress 4.0 or CFexpress Type B support, with the camera's CFexpress 2.0 Type A slots imposing a bottleneck on buffer readout. Chris Gampat of The Phoblographer criticized its autofocus performance on subjects with darker skin tones in low light situations, comparing it unfavorably to the Nikon Z9.

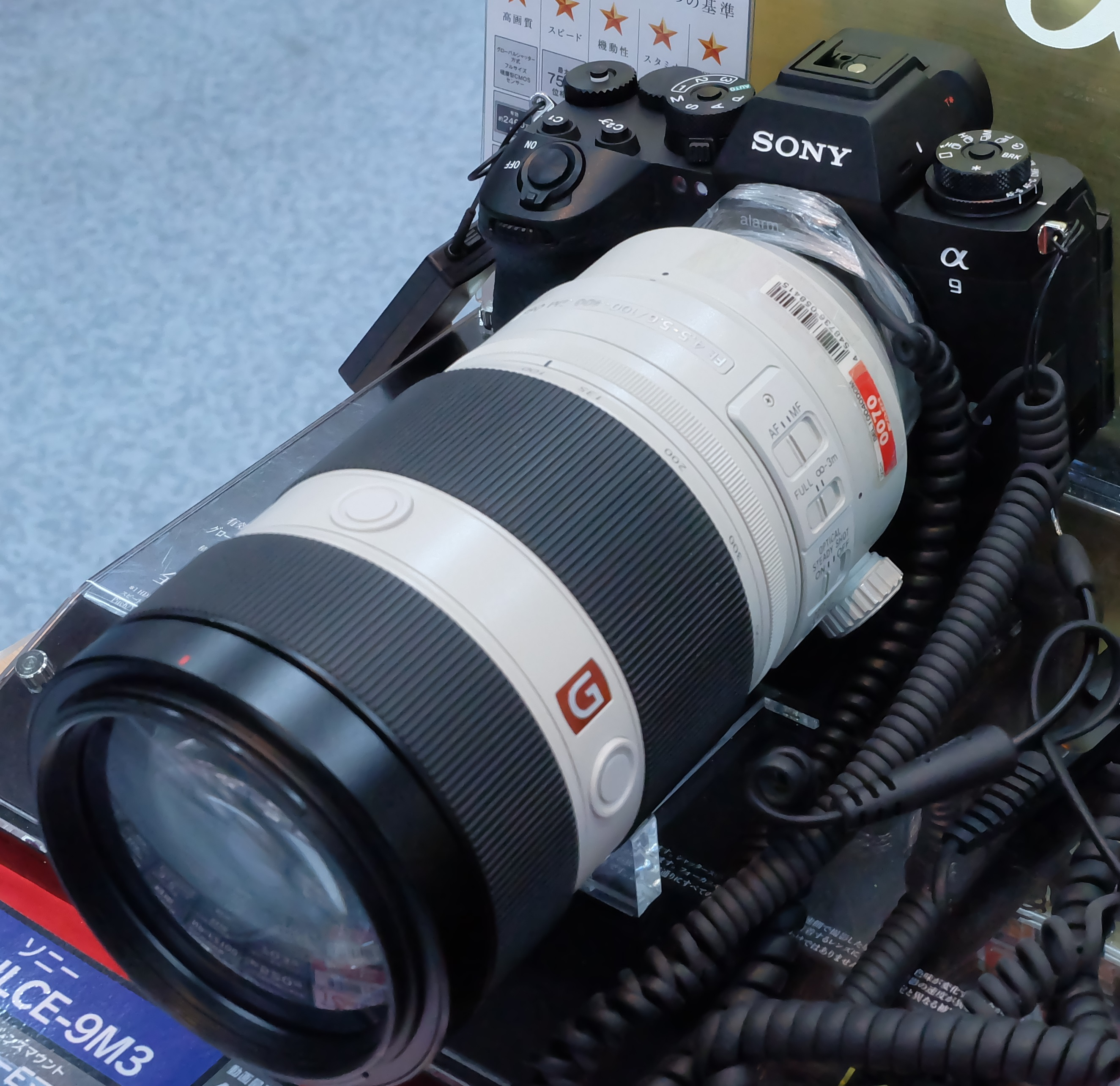

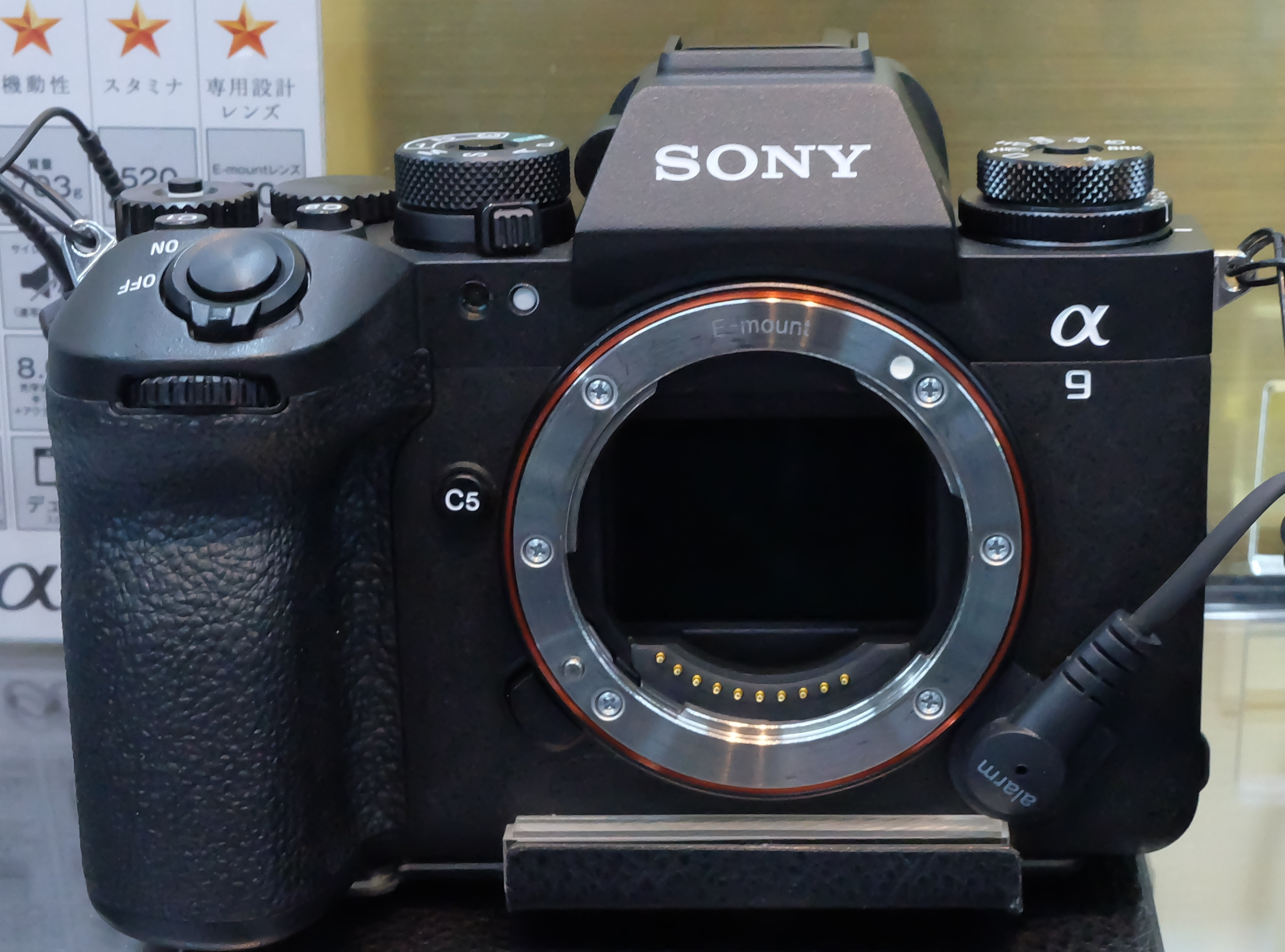

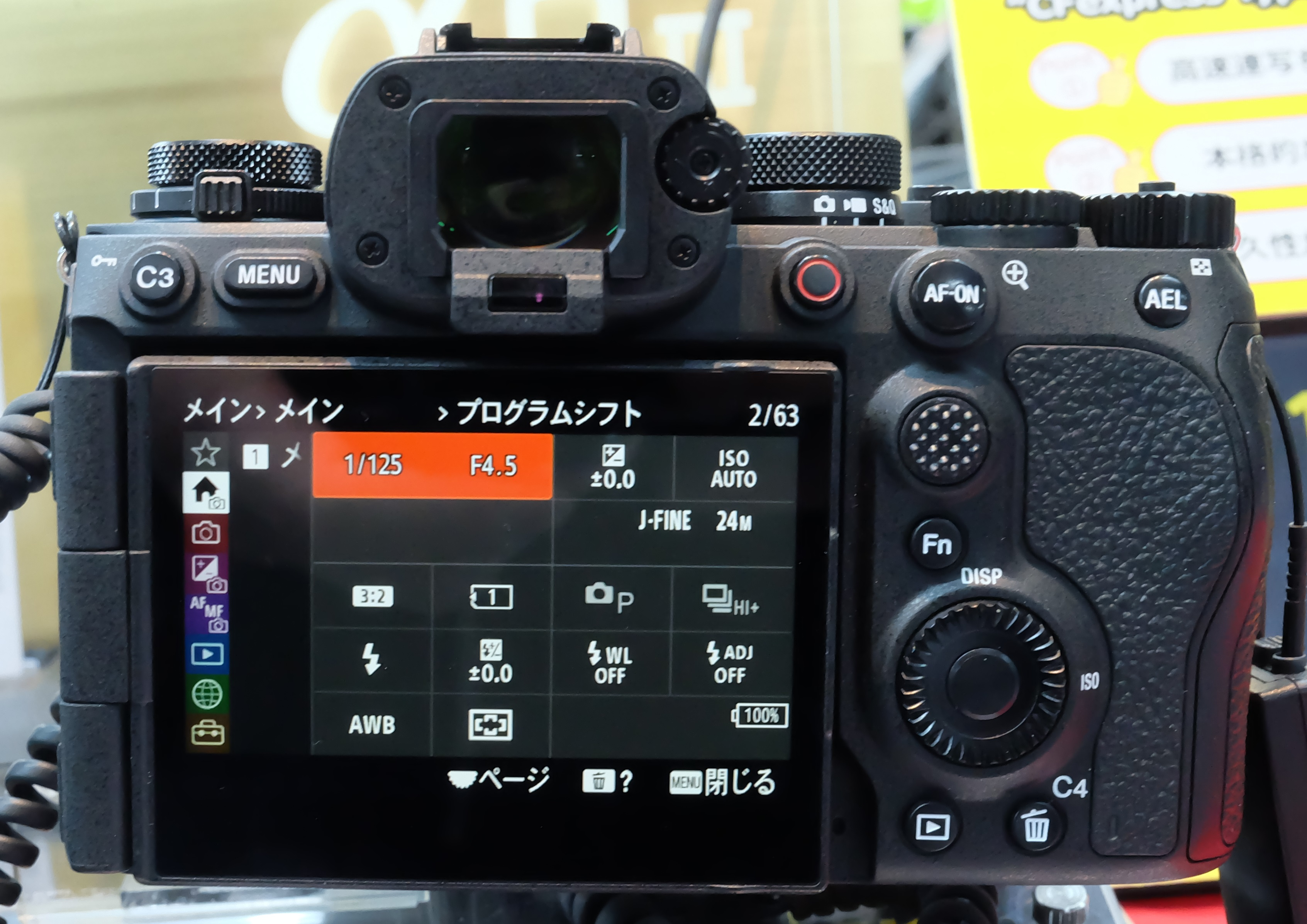

Family	Level	Format	'10	2011		2012	2013	2014	2015	2016	2017	2018	2019	2020	2021	2022	2023	2024	2025	2026
Alpha (α)	Indust	FF																ILX-LR1 ^{●}		
Alpha (α)	Cine line	FF													_{m} FX6 ^{●}					
Alpha (α)	Cine line	FF																		_{m} FX5 ^{AT●}
Alpha (α)	Cine line	FF													_{m} FX3 ^{AT●}					
Alpha (α)	Cine line	FF																		_{m} FX2 ^{AT●}
Alpha (α)	Flag	FF													_{m} α1 ^{FT●}				_{m} α1 II ^{FAT●}	
Alpha (α)	Speed	FF										_{m} α9 ^{FT●}			_{m} α9 II ^{FT●}				_{m} α9 III ^{FAT●}	
Alpha (α)	Sens	FF							_{m} α7S ^{●}	_{m} α7S II ^{F●}					_{m} α7S III ^{AT●}					
Alpha (α)	Hi-Res	FF						_{m} α7R ^{●}		_{m} α7R II ^{F●}		_{m} α7R III ^{FT●}		_{m} α7R IV ^{FT●}			_{m} α7R V ^{FAT●}			_{m} α7R VI ^{FAT●}
Alpha (α)	Basic	FF						_{m} α7 ^{F●}	_{m} α7 II ^{F●}				_{m} α7 III ^{FT●}			_{m} α7 IV ^{AT●}				_{m} α7 V ^{FAT●}
Alpha (α)	Compact	FF																_{m} α7CR ^{AT●}		
Alpha (α)	Compact	FF													_{m} α7C ^{AT●}			_{m} α7C II ^{AT●}		
Alpha (α)	Vlog	FF																_{m} ZV-E1 ^{AT●}		
Alpha (α)	Cine	APS-C															_{m} FX30 ^{AT●}			
Alpha (α)	Adv	APS-C			_{s} NEX-7 ^{F●}						_{m} α6500 ^{FT●}			_{m} α6600 ^{FT●}				_{m} α6700 ^{AT●}		
Alpha (α)	Mid-range	APS-C				_{m} NEX-6 ^{F●}					_{m} α6300 ^{F●}		_{m} α6400 ^{F+T●}							
Alpha (α)	Mid-range	APS-C						_{m} α6000 ^{F●}						_{m} α6100 ^{FT●}						
Alpha (α)	Vlog	APS-C														_{m} ZV-E10 ^{AT●}			_{m} ZV-E10 II ^{AT●}	
Alpha (α)	Entry-level	APS-C	NEX-5 ^{F●}	NEX-5N ^{FT●}		NEX-5R ^{F+T●}	NEX-5T ^{F+T●}		α5100 ^{F+T●}											
Alpha (α)	Entry-level	APS-C	NEX-3 ^{F●}	NEX-C3 ^{F●}		NEX-F3 ^{F+●}	NEX-3N ^{F+●}	α5000 ^{F+●}												
DSLR-style		APS-C					_{m} α3000 ^{●}		_{m} α3500 ^{●}											
SmartShot		APS-C							QX1 ^{M●}											
CineAlta	Cine line	FF										VENICE				VENICE 2				
CineAlta	Cine line	FF																BURANO		
XDCAM	Cine line	FF												_{m} FX9						
XDCAM	Docu	S35							_{m} FS7		_{m} FS7 II									
XDCAM	Mobile	S35								_{m} FS5			_{m} FS5 II							
NXCAM	Pro	S35		NEX-FS100		NEX-FS700	NEX-FS700R													
NXCAM	APS-C					NEX-EA50														
Handycam	FF					_{m} NEX-VG900														
Handycam	APS-C		_{s} NEX-VG10		_{s} NEX-VG20	_{m} NEX-VG30														
Security		FF									SNC-VB770									
Security		FF									UMC-S3C									
Family	Level	Format																		
Family	Level	Format	'10	2011		2012	2013	2014	2015	2016	2017	2018	2019	2020	2021	2022	2023	2024	2025	2026
