= Panasonic Lumix DC-G9 =

Digital camera model

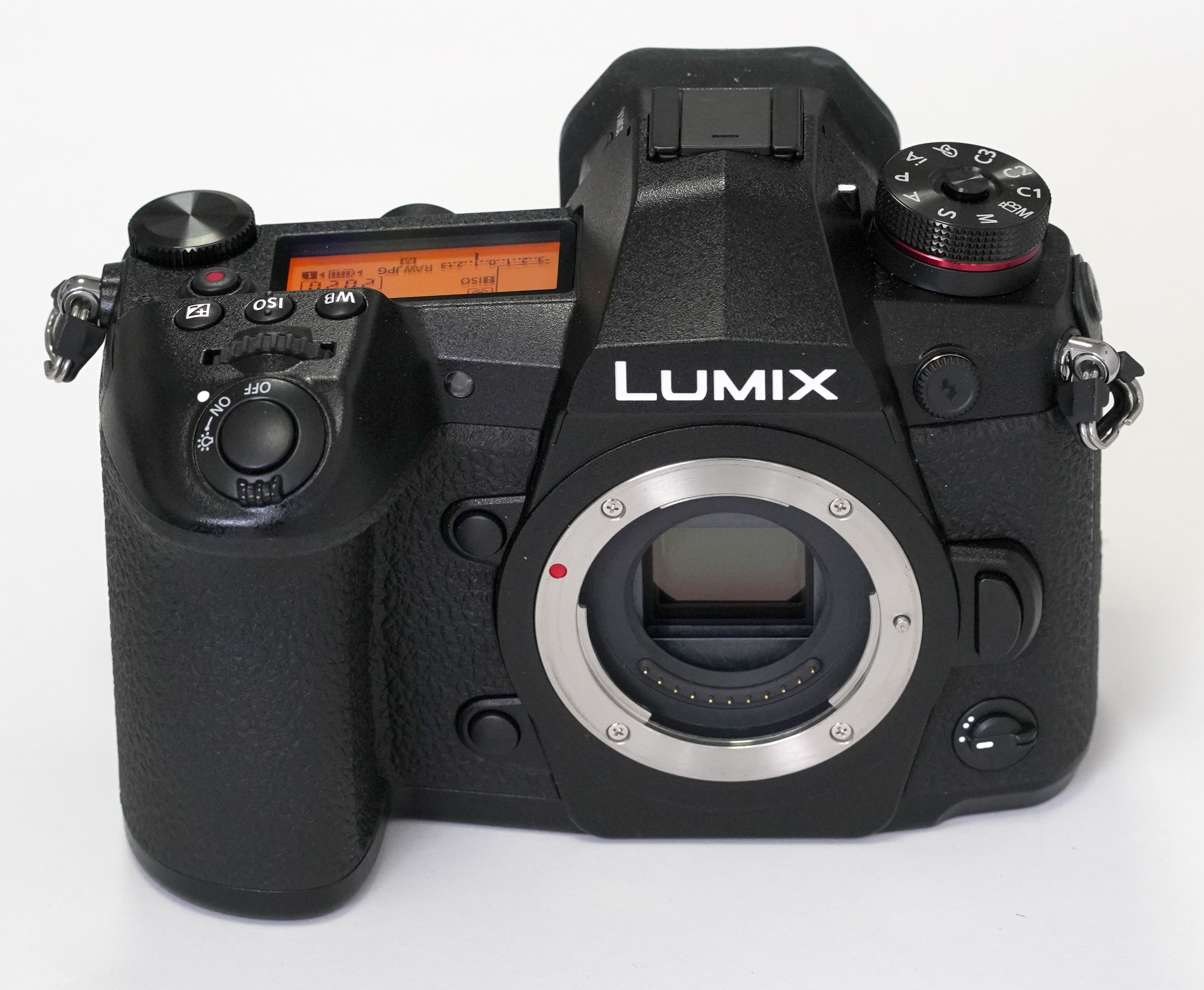

Overview
- Maker: Panasonic Holdings Corporation
- Type: Micro Four Thirds system mirrorless camera
- Released: December 2017

Lens
- Lens mount: Micro Four Thirds system mount

Sensor/medium
- Sensor: 4/3-type
- Sensor type: CMOS
- Sensor size: 17.3 x 13 mm (4:3 aspect ratio)
- Sensor maker: Sony
- Maximum resolution: 5184 x 3888 px (20.1 megapixels)
- Film speed: ISO 200-25600, extendable to 100
- Recording medium: 2x SD / SDHC / SDXC (both UHS-II-compatible)

Focusing
- Focus: Switchable Auto and Manual
- Focus modes: AF-C (Continuous-Servo), AF-F (Flexible AF), AF-S (Single Servo AF), Manual Focus
- Focus areas: 225 Contrast Detection AF

Exposure/metering
- Exposure modes: Program AE; Aperture Priority, Shutter priority, Manual
- Metering modes: Center-weighted, Multiple, Spot

Flash
- Flash synchronization: 1/250
- Flash bracketing: ±3 EV in ⅓ EV steps

Shutter
- Shutter: Focal-plane shutter / Electronic shutter
- Shutter speed range: 1/16000s - 60s, bulb
- Continuous shooting: 12 fps (mechanical shutter) 20 fps (electronic shutter) at 20.3 MP (both with raw files); 30 fps at 18MP (JPEG); 60 fps at 8 MP (JPEG)

Viewfinder
- Viewfinder: OLED viewfinder; 3.68 Mdots
- Viewfinder magnification: 0.8376x

Image processing
- White balance: Auto, Cloudy, Shade, Incadescent, Flash, Daylight, White Set 1/2/3/4, Custom WB based on color temperature

General
- Video recording: AVCHD / MP4 / MOV; 3840 x 2160 (up to 60p); 1920 x 1080p (up to 60p)
- LCD screen: 3.2", 1.6M Dots, free-angle
- Battery: 7.2v 1860 mAh Lithium-ion battery pack
- AV port: HDMI / USB 3.0
- Data port(s): Wi-Fi, Bluetooth, full-sized HDMI Type-A, USB 3.1 Gen1 5Gbit/s,
- Dimensions: 138.5×98.1×87.4 mm (5.45×3.86×3.44 in) (5.5 * 3.9 * 3.4")
- Weight: 650 g (23 oz) (battery and SD cards inserted)
- Made in: China

The Panasonic Lumix DC-G9 is a Micro Four Thirds mirrorless interchangeable lens camera body announced by Panasonic at the end of 2017.

The Panasonic G9 is a more still-centric variant of the Panasonic Lumix DC-GH5: it can shoot up to 20 pictures per second in full resolution and with continuous focusing, interruption-free live view as well as raw recording. Furthermore, it shows a larger viewfinder image.

The G9 offers an 80-megapixel high-resolution mode, where eight 20-megapixel shots are taken with shifted image sensor. The image stabiliser is used for shifting the image sensor in 1.7-micrometer-steps, which are equal to the half of the pixel pitch of about 3.3 micrometers. This mode is limited to use with stationary or nearly stationary subjects, unless artistic effects are desired.

The DC-G9 won the Camera Grand Prix 2018 (japanese) Editors award.

== DC-G9M2 ==
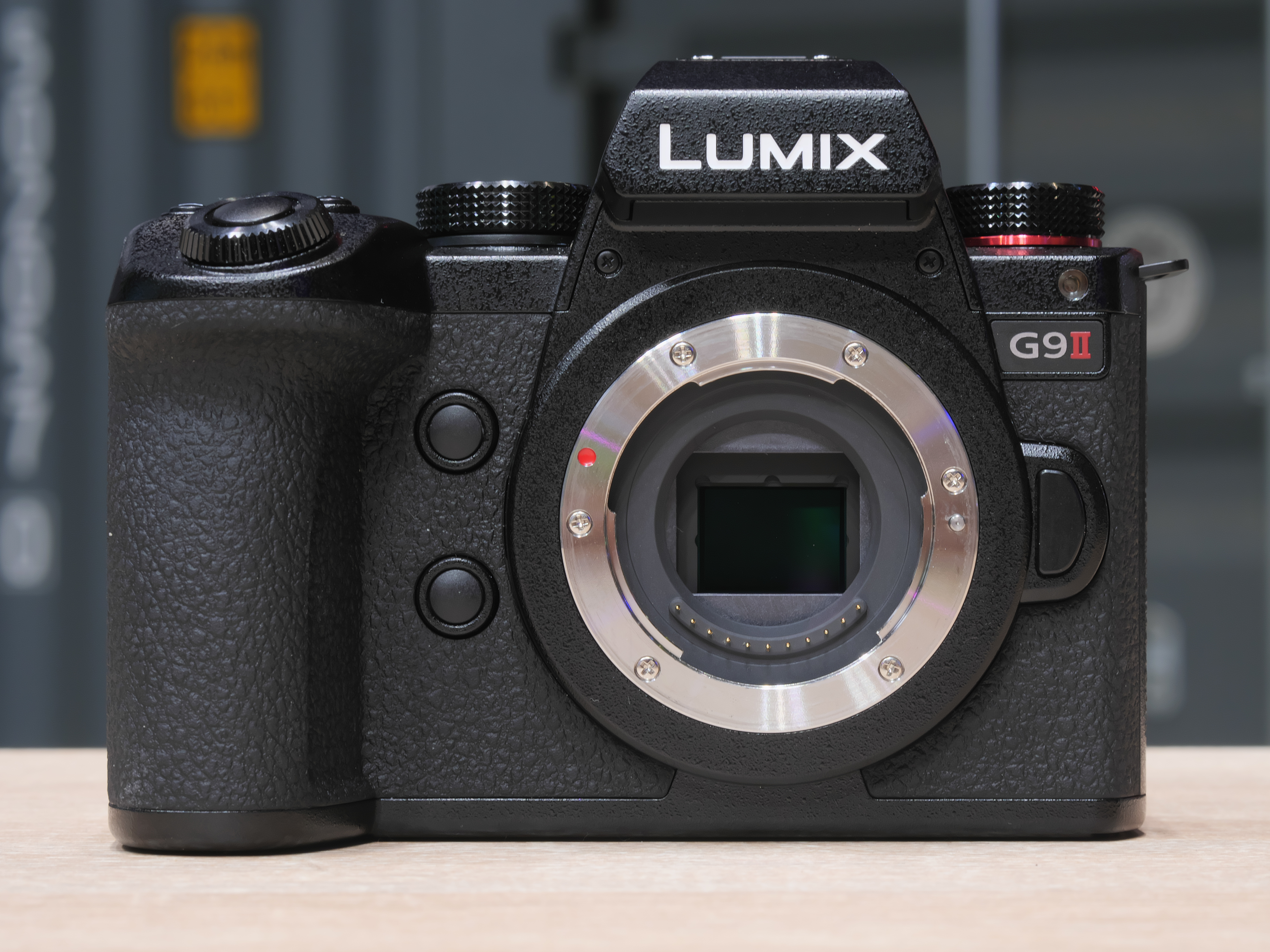
Panasonic Lumix DC-G9 II

In September 2023 the successor Panasonic Lumix DC-G9M2, also calling "DC-G9 II" and "Lumix G9 PRO II"(in Japan) was presented. The differences mainly consist of the following features:

- Image sensor:
  - Higher image resolution 25.2 megapixels
  - Higher dynamic range with more than 13 stops
  - Autofocus with phase detection sensors
- More powerful processors
- Faster burst rate with up to 60 images per second inclusive autofocus
- Pre-burst images up to 1.5 seconds before the complete depressing of the release button
- High resolution mode (100 megapixels) at (free-hand) shots without a tripod
- Video recording in 4:2:0 10-bit 5.8K (4:3) and 4:2:0 10-bit 4K / 120p (time lapse)
- Recording and replay with external solid-state drive via USB
- No liquid-crystal display on top of the camera
- Two mode dials
- Bluetooth support
- Miniature joystick with diagonal control

== Sample image ==
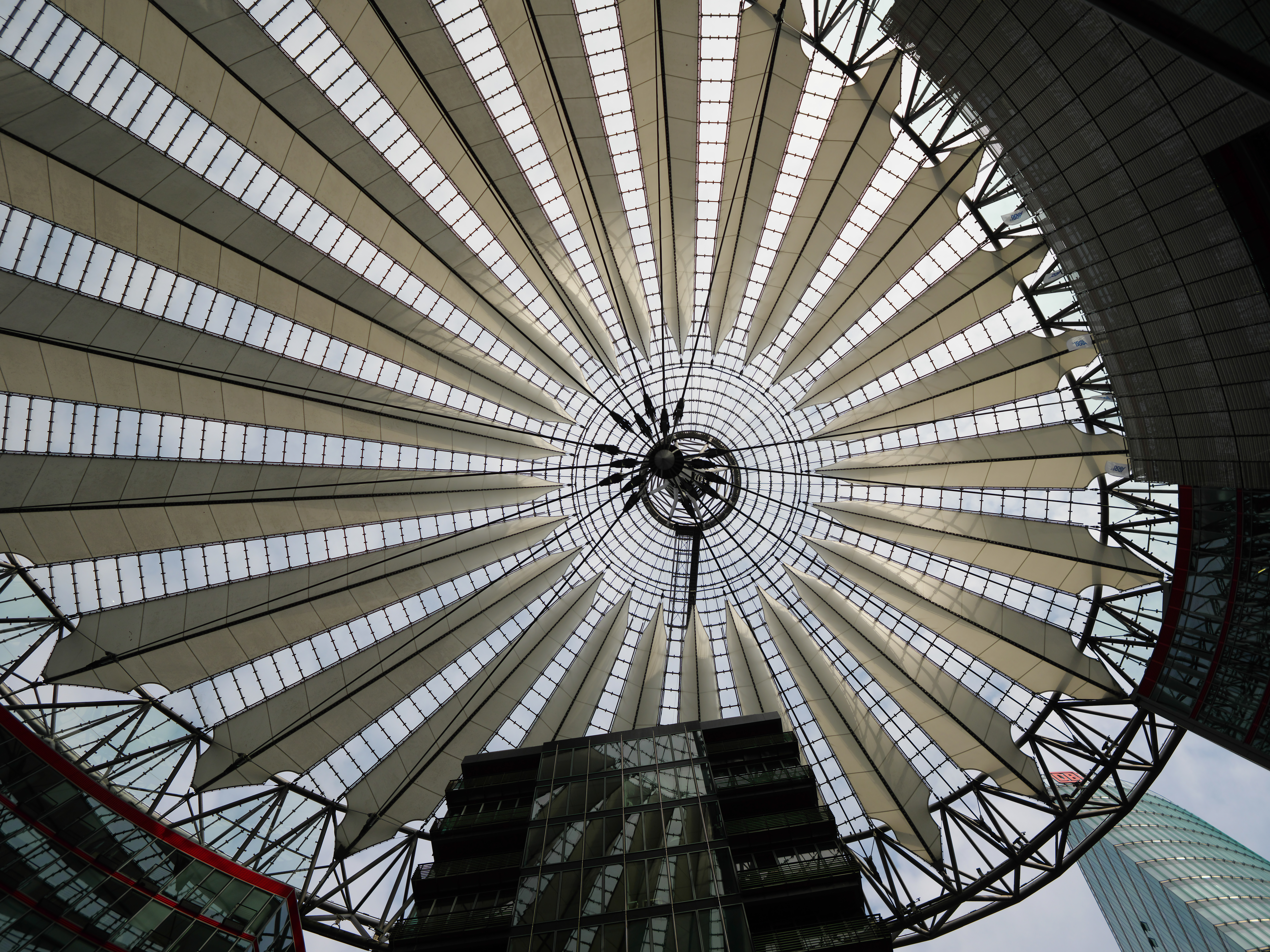
80 megapixel high-resolution indoor shot of the roof of the Sony Center in Berlin

Brand	Form	Class	2008	2009	2010	2011			2012	2013	2014	2015	2016	2017	2018	2019	2020	2021	2022	2023	2024	2025	2026
Olympus	SLR style OM-D	Professional															E-M1X ^{R}						
Olympus	SLR style OM-D	High-end									E-M1			E-M1 II ^{R}			E-M1 III ^{R}						
Olympus	SLR style OM-D	Advanced							E-M5			E-M5 II ^{R}					E-M5 III ^{R}						
Olympus	SLR style OM-D	Mid-range									E-M10		E-M10 II		E-M10 III			E-M10 IV					
Olympus	Rangefinder style PEN	Mid-range		E-P1	E-P2		E-P3				E-P5		PEN-F ^{R}										
Olympus	Rangefinder style PEN	Upper-entry			E-PL1	E-PL2		E-PL3	E-PL5		E-PL6	E-PL7		E-PL8	E-PL9		E-PL10						
Olympus	Rangefinder style PEN	Entry-level					E-PM1		E-PM2														
Olympus	remote													Air									
OM System	SLR style	Professional																	OM-1 ^{R}		OM-1 II ^{R}		
OM System	SLR style	High-end																				OM-3 ^{R}	
OM System	SLR style	Advanced																		OM-5 ^{R}			OM-5 II ^{R}
OM System	PEN	Mid-range																	E-P7				
Panasonic	SLR style	High-end Video													GH5S				GH6 ^{R}			GH7 ^{R}	
Panasonic	SLR style	High-end Photo													G9 ^{R}						G9 II ^{R}		
Panasonic	SLR style	High-end		GH1		GH2			GH3		GH4				GH5				GH5II				
Panasonic	SLR style	Mid-range		G1	G2		G3		G5		G6		G7	G80/G85			G90/G95						
Panasonic	SLR style	Entry-level			G10													G100			G100D		
Panasonic	Rangefinder style	Advanced							GX1		GX7		GX8		GX9								
Panasonic	Rangefinder style	Mid-range									GM1	GM5	GX80/GX85										
Panasonic	Rangefinder style	Entry-level			GF1	GF2	GF3		GF5		GF6	GF7	GF8	GX800/GX850/GF9		GX880/GF10/GF90							
Panasonic	Camcorder	Professional							AG-AF104														
Kodak	Rangefinder style	Entry-level										S-1											
DJI	Drone	.												Zenmuse X5S									
DJI	Drone	.												Zenmuse X5									
YI	Rangefinder style	Entry-level												M1									
Yongnuo	Rangefinder style	Android camera															YN450M		YN455				
Blackmagic Design	Rangefinder style	High-End Video							Cinema Camera														
Blackmagic Design	Rangefinder style	High-End Video									Pocket Cinema Camera					Pocket Cinema Camera 4K							
Blackmagic Design		High-End Video										Micro Cinema Camera									Micro Studio Camera 4K G2		
Z CAM	Cinema	Advanced											E1			E2							
Z CAM	Cinema	Mid-Range																E2-M4					
Z CAM	Cinema	Entry-Level															E2C						
JVC	Camcorder	Professional										GY-LS300											
SVS-Vistek		Industrial							EVO Tracer														
