= Olympus Tough TG-6 =

Point-and-shoot camera released 2019

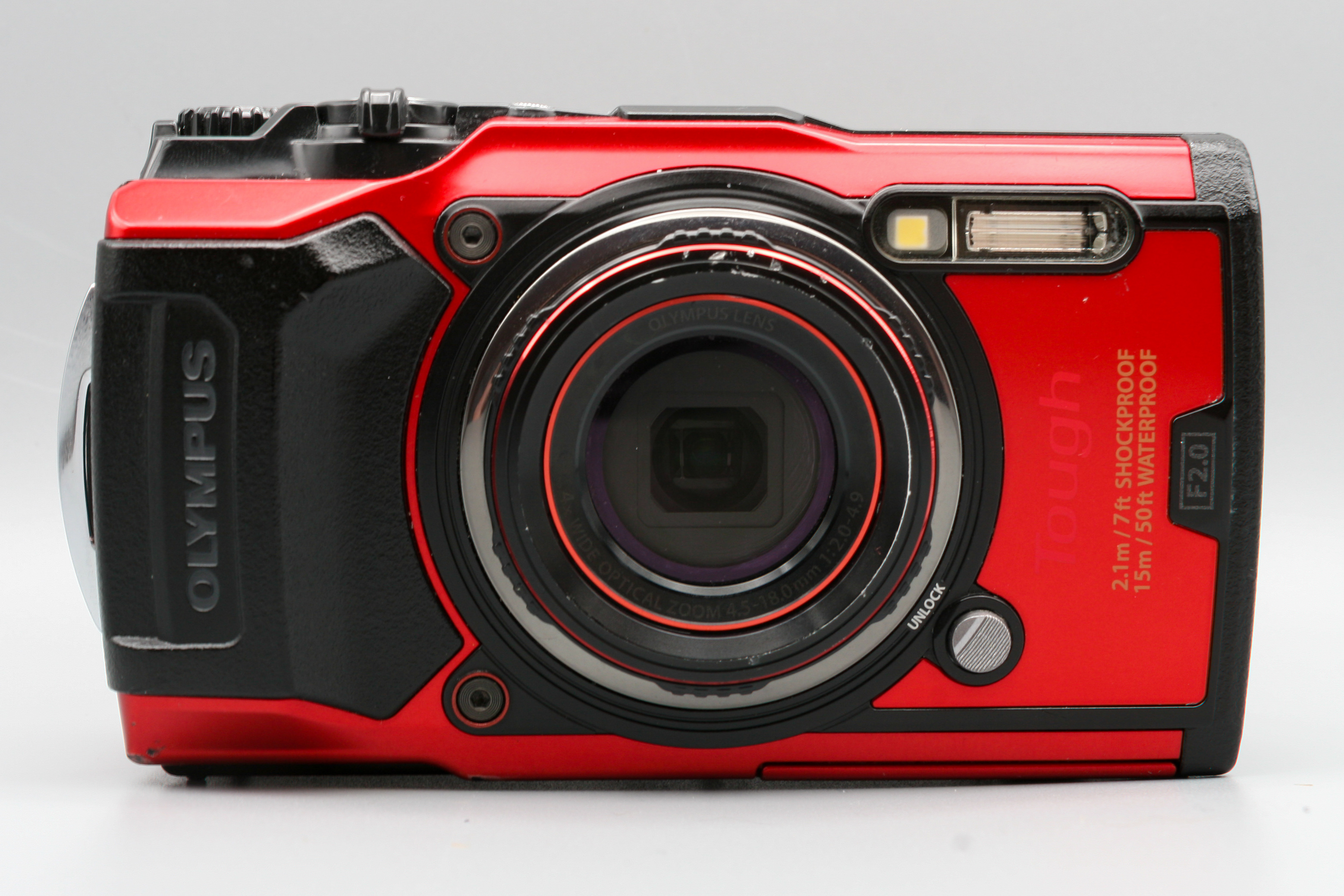
- Front view of the TG-6

Overview
- Maker: Olympus Corporation

Lens
- Lens: 4.5-18mm (35mm equivalent: 25-100mm)
- F-numbers: f/2.0 wide - f/4.9 tele (35mm equivalent: f/11.1 wide - f/27.2 tele)

Sensor/medium
- Sensor type: BSI-CMOS
- Sensor size: 6.17 x 4.55mm (1/2.3 inch type)
- Maximum resolution: 4000 x 3000 (12 megapixels)
- Film speed: AUTO ISO: 100 ‐ 1600 with customizable upper limit from 100 to 12800 Manual ISO: 100 - 12800 (adjustable)
- Recording medium: SD, SDHC, SDXC, Eye-Fi Card compatible

Focusing
- Focus bracketing: Yes

Shutter
- Shutter speeds: 1/2 - 1/2000 sec. (Night Scene, A mode: up to 4 sec.)
- Continuous shooting: 20 fps with selectable 10/20 fps

Viewfinder
- Viewfinder magnification: 4x Optical zoom

Image processing
- Image processor: Olympus TruePic™ VIII
- White balance: Yes

General
- Video recording: 4K at 30p and HD at 120fps
- LCD screen: Colour LCD, 3 inches with 1,040,000 dots
- Battery: LI-92B Li-ion battery
- AV port: Micro HDMI (Type D)
- Data port(s): Built-in (IEEE 802.11 b/g/n), USB 2.0 (Micro-B)
- Body features: Hermetically sealed. Waterproof rating is now 15m. Can be dropped from 2.1m/7ft. It's also freezeproof to -10C/+14F and dustproof.
- Dimensions: 113×66×32 mm (4.4×2.6×1.3 in) (4.45 * 2.6 * 1.26″)
- Weight: 253 g (0.56 lb / 8.92 oz)

The Olympus Tough TG-6 is a compact waterproof digital camera announced by the Olympus Corporation on May 22, 2019. It differs from its predecessor, the Olympus Tough TG-5, by including new underwater modes, more macro photo options as well as a display with improved resolution.

The TG-6 is technically very similar to the Olympus TG-4 and TG-5. The physical dimensions of the TG-4, TG-5 and the TG-6 are identical.

The Olympus Tough TG-6's successor the OM System Tough TG-7 would be announced on September 13th, 2023, at an MSRP of US$549. The TG-7 has minor differences such as a USB-C charging port, and being rebranded with OM System branding over Olympus.
