= Panasonic Lumix DC-S5M2 =

Panasonic LUMIX DC-S5M2
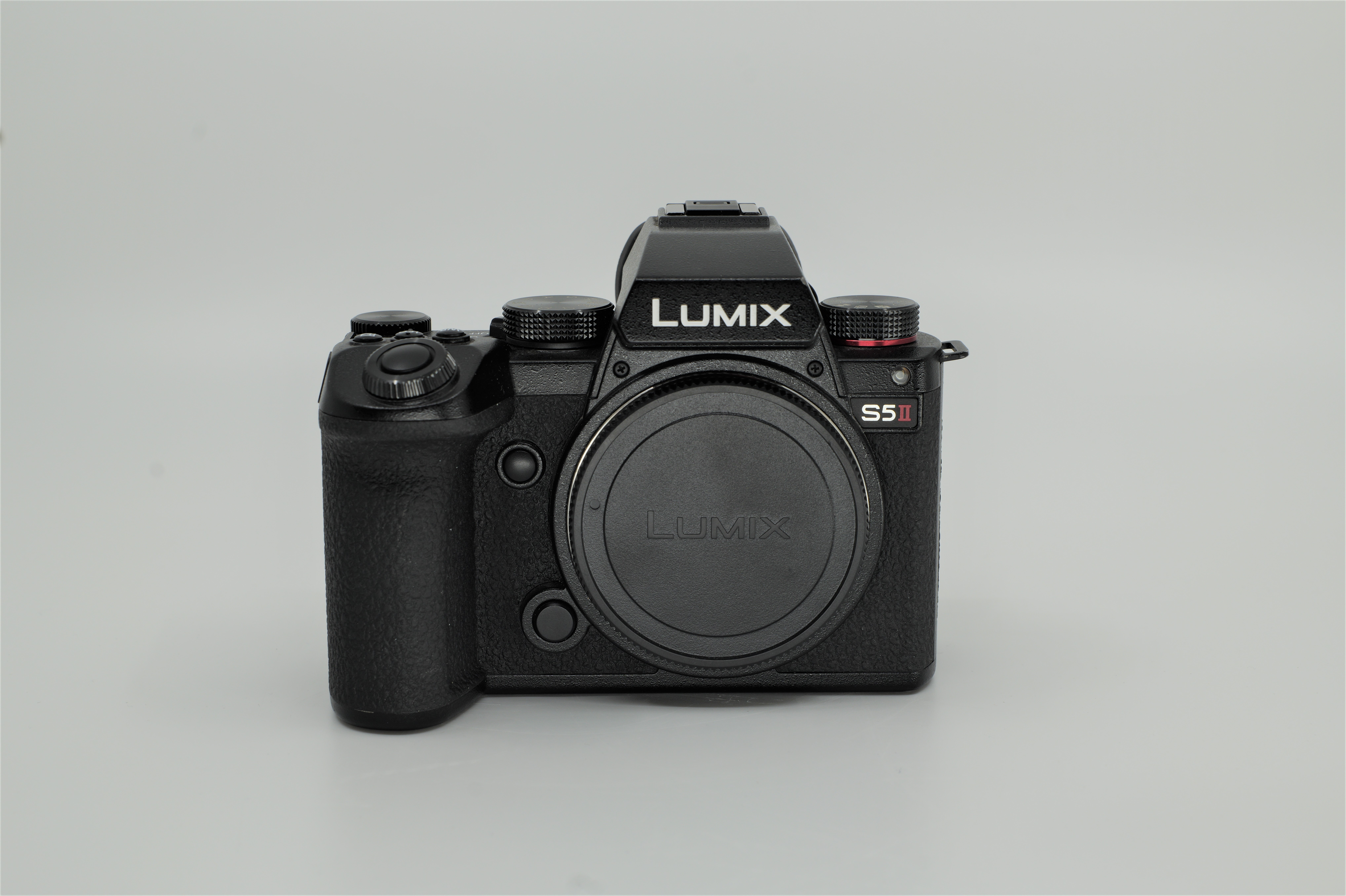
- Panasonic LUMIX DC-S5M2 mirrorless camera from the front

Overview
- Maker: Panasonic Corporation
- Type: Mirrorless interchangeable-lens digital camera (full-frame)
- Released: 16 February 2023; 3 years ago

Lens
- Lens mount: Leica L-Mount
- Lens: L-Mount system
- Compatible lenses: L-Mount lenses

Sensor/medium
- Sensor type: Digital CMOS (BSI CMOS)
- Sensor size: 35.6 × 23.8 mm (full-frame)
- Sensor maker: Sony Semiconductor Manufacturing Corporation
- Maximum resolution: 24.2 megapixels (6000 × 4000)
- Recording medium: SD/SDHC/SDXC (dual slots, UHS-II)

Focusing
- Focus: Autofocus + Manual focus
- Focus modes: AFS (Single), AFC (Continuous), MF
- Focus areas: 779-point phase hybrid AF (phase + contrast)
- Focus bracketing: Yes

Exposure/metering
- Exposure: TTL metering
- Exposure bracketing: Yes
- Exposure modes: Program AE, Aperture priority, Shutter priority, Manual
- Exposure metering: TTL multi-zone
- Metering modes: Multiple / Center-weighted / Spot

Flash
- Flash: Hot shoe
- Flash exposure compensation: Yes
- Flash synchronization: Up to 1/250 sec (mechanical shutter)
- Flash bracketing: Yes
- Compatible flashes: Panasonic external flashes (e.g., DMW series)

Shutter
- Frame rate: Up to 30 fps
- Shutter: Mechanical and electronic shutter
- Shutter speed range: Mechanical: 1/8000 - 60 sec Electronic: 1/8,000 - 60 sec
- Continuous shooting: Up to 30 fps (electronic), up to 9 fps (mechanical)

Viewfinder
- Viewfinder: Electronic viewfinder (OLED)
- Viewfinder magnification: 0.78×
- Frame coverage: Approx. 100%

Image processing
- Image processor: Venus Engine
- White balance: Auto, Presets, Custom
- WB bracketing: Yes

General
- Video recording: 6K (approx. 5952×3968) up to 30p 5.9K (5888 × 3312) up to 30p 4K UHD (3840×2160) up to 60p Full HD (1920×1080) up to 180 fps (slow motion)
- LCD screen: 3.0-inch fully articulating touchscreen LCD, 1.8M-dot resolution
- Battery: DMW-BLK22 rechargeable Li-ion battery USB-PD rechargeable
- Optional battery packs: Battery grip (DMW series)
- Optional accessories: Battery grip, external microphone, cages, L-Mount lenses
- AV port(s): HDMI (Type A), USB-C
- Data port(s): USB-C, Wi-Fi, Bluetooth
- Body features: Magnesium alloy body, dust/splash/freeze resistant, IBIS
- Dimensions: 134.3 mm × 102.3 mm × 90.1 mm (5.29 in × 4.03 in × 3.55 in)
- Weight: 740 g (26 oz) (1.63 lb) including battery and memory card
- Made in: PR China

Chronology
- Predecessor: Panasonic Lumix DC-S5

The Panasonic LUMIX DC-S5M2 (also known as the LUMIX S5 II) is a digital, full frame mirrorless interchangeable-lens camera. It was released by Panasonic in January 2023 as part of the LUMIX S series. It was followed by the S5IIX, a variant with a more extensive video feature set, five months later. It uses a 24 MP BSI CMOS sensor and is designed as a hybrid model that includes features for both still photography and video. The camera also provides options for 6K video, built-in stabilization, 30 fps bursts, and extended recording times due to its introduction of an internal cooling fan. The S5II also improved autofocus capabilities by introducing a new hybrid phase detection autofocus system with 779 points on the sensor.

The S5II is a successor to the LUMIX S5.

== Features ==
=== Video capabilities ===
The S5II has many options for resolutions, aspect ratios, and frame rates. New to the S series, the S5II supports full sensor-height 3:2 open-gate recording at up to 30p with 10-bit 4:2:0 color sampling, allowing flexibility for cropping into different aspect ratios such as 16:9, 9:16, or 1:1 or reframing in post-production. It also offers 6K recording options in both UHD-style 16:9 and DCI-like 1.89:1 formats. It also has full-width 4K modes in both DCI and UHD formats, which are derived from 6K capture and are available at up to 30p with up to 10-bit 4:2:2 encoding.

The S5II includes a built-in cooling fan that enables extended recording performance, supporting unlimited recording times in 4K and up to approximately 30 minutes of continuous 6K capture. It also has a wide range of standard and customizable features including various exposure settings and monitoring tools, and video mode lists. A range of picture profiles is also available for video work.

For audio, in the MOV container format, the S5II has the option for stereo 24-bit/48kHz with LPCM encoding and can also record 4-channel audio with an optional adapter. It also includes line-level input and dual input gain settings on its mic inputs in addition to more standard audio options.

=== Still photography features ===
For photography, the S5II can capture still images at up to 9 frames per second using its mechanical shutter mechanism, or up to 30 frames per second with its electronic shutter. The camera has a large buffer, allowing for bursts of 360 RAW images or 380 JPEG images with the mechanical shutter, and around 200 images when shooting at 30 fps with the electronic shutter. A burst shooting mode that can pre-capture up to 1.5 seconds of images in the buffer was added in an April 2024 update. It does not support the HEIF format, but it can shift its sensor with pixel-level precision in an electronic shutter multi-shot mode while using a tripod.

A notable option for photography is the “High Resolution” (pixel shift) mode which uses the S5II’s electronic shutter to capture 8 images while the IBIS system shifts the sensor between each shot, resulting in a photo with higher resolution and reduced color moiré.

While it made improvements on the S5’s autofocus capabilities for moving subjects like sports or wildlife, for still photography, this camera is often recommended for portraits, landscapes, or images of static subjects.

The S5II also has options to serve volume photographers, like those providing school photos, that were added in a firmware update in October 2025. The update added a new menu for Photo Grid Lines and masks, and the ability to automatically lock the camera between barcode scans or use multiple scans per photo to embed data into photo files.

=== Autofocus ===
The S5II marks a change from previous LUMIX bodies which relied on Depth From Defocus (DFD) Contrast autofocus. The S5II uses a hybrid system which combines masked phase detection autofocus with contrast-based algorithms and 779 points on the sensor. The new system allows the camera to refocus without having to move the lens and without overshooting which is useful in video mode and when holding focus is required. The camera allows the user to choose an AF point, allowing, for example, the selection of a particular person within a group rather than relying on automatic selection of the nearest subject as in previous models. It has been noted that autofocus performance is consistent and reliable in video use.

In April 2024, the S5II’s subject recognition and tracking modes were upgraded to recognize humans, animals, cars and motorcycles, or can specifically identify eyes and face or body.

=== Body ===
The body of the S5II has a magnesium alloy frame and is weather-sealed to provide dust and splash resistance. Its dimensions are approximately 5.29 x 4.03 x 3.55 inches and it weighs 1.63 pounds. Compared to the S5, it has a larger handgrip for better balance with heavy lenses. Its new built-in fan allows for unlimited video shooting at temperatures up to 40°C (104°F).

Dual memory card slots support SDXC cards and SD (UHS II) transfer speeds.

The S5II also features an OLED electronic viewfinder with 3.68 million dots with 0.78x magnification and which can be set to refresh at 60 or 120fps. The LCD display is a three-inch articulating 1.8-million dot touchscreen that can flip and rotate.

The S5II retains much of the button and dial design of the S5 making it easy to transition from one to the other. Buttons are configurable and customizable. It has standard controls, but also allows for quick switching between modes without having to go into a main menu, and has an 8 point joystick to set focus.

The S5II uses the 15.8Wh DMW-BLK22 battery which is CIPA-rated to provide 370 shots. With the power-saving options, this can jump to 1250 exposures. It is chargeable via USB-C. It can also be used with the DMW-BGS5 battery grip, and the same AC adaptor, DC coupler and dedicated battery chargers that are also compatible with the S5.

The S5II also introduced a new processing engine, the first product of Panasonic’s L² co-development project with Leica. It has two times the signal processing speed for high bit-rate video recording and high burst rate photography.

=== Image sensor ===
The S5II features a 24 megapixel, full frame BSI CMOS sensor. The camera has a standard sensitivity range of ISO 100 to 51,200, with extended options down to ISO 50 and up to ISO 204,800. The S5II’s sensor provides strong dynamic range, with clean shadow detail at low ISO.

=== Lenses ===
The S5II works with Leica L-Mount lenses. Like other LUMIX S bodies, this includes a wide range of lenses from Panasonic, Sigma, Leica, and more. Because it is compatible with so many lenses, the S5II recognizes the focal length of an analog lens and automatically uses the IBIS unit to stabilize.

=== In-body image stabilization ===
The S5II has a built-in IBIS unit. Its five-axis system has up to five stops of stability, or 6.5 stops with Dual IS when using it with a telephoto lens with stabilization. It debuted Panasonic’s Active IS algorithm with its IBIS unit which stabilizes most hand-held shooting, particularly with longer focal lengths and anamorphic lenses. It also has a Boost IS mode, which tries to minimize movement for a tripod-like look when shooting video.

A firmware update in April 2024 added a new “High” setting to the camera's electronic image stabilization system to compensate for extreme movement like running with the camera, and applies a 1.4x crop factor to video.

=== Connectivity and smart features ===
The S5II has ports for a full-size HDMI cable as well as USB-C, 3.5mm microphone and headphone jacks.

The S5II includes WiFi for file transfers and connection with the LUMIX Sync app as well as Bluetooth for pairing with wireless remotes or other hardware.

An April 2024 update added capability for Camera-to-Cloud (C2C) integration with Adobe’s Frame.io which allows content to be sent from the camera to the platform via Wi-Fi or USB tethering. The update also added proxy recording for easy to share low resolution files alongside high-bit-rate video. The proxies are recorded to card slot 2, with the primary footage captured to slot 1 or an external SSD.

A hot shoe supports on-camera accessories like an external flash or an XLR audio interface. The S5II also integrates with the LUMIX DMS1 microphone launched in February 2026 via the camera’s hot shoe to improve audio quality without extra cables.

=== Assist tools and features ===
The S5II has a wide range of video feature sets including various exposure settings and monitoring tools like waveform and vectorscope displays that remain active during recording, and custom lists for video modes and a tally lamp to signify recording. It also provides frame masking tools for working with different aspect ratios and supports anamorphic preview with selectable desqueeze ratios for monitoring.

The camera also includes custom and built-in options for color profiles for both stills and video. This includes portrait, vivid, landscape, and film-like looks like L.ClassicNeo or L.Monochrome. There are also options like V-Log, CineD2, CineV2, and Rec.2100 HLG which can be used to match different production and grading workflows, alongside the camera’s standard photo-based color profiles. Users can maintain independent configurations and settings when switching between stills and video.

Improving on the S5, the S5II added the ability to import Lookup tables (LUTs) in the cube format that can be used as you shoot. It can store up to 10 LUTs and can also be modified in real time.

=== Similar cameras ===
The LUMIX S5II and S5IIX share many features with other Panasonic mirrorless cameras. They both have the same 15.8Wh DMW-BLK22 battery as the LUMIX S1RII, S9, S1II and S1IIE. They also have the same L-mount as the rest of the LUMIX S bodies.

The Canon EOS R6 Mark II and the Sony α7 IV are the S5II's main competitors. Meanwhile, the S5IIX has a wider range of video capabilities than other contemporary models.

== LUMIX DC-S5M2X ==
The LUMIX DC-S5M2X is a variant of the LUMIX DC-S5M2 that differs only in that it has a more extensive video feature set and different coloring. The S5IIX has the same body design as the S5II except that it has a monochrome all-black design with blacked-out 'Lumix' branding and no red accents on the control dials.

In terms of features, the S5IIX allows video recording to SSD over USB. It also has the ability to capture video with less compression by adding +H.264 All-I and +ProRes (422/422 HQ). It also has RAW video output that can be encoded as either ProRes RAW or BRaw. It can output 5.9K 16:9 footage from the full width of its sensor at up to 30p, or 1.89:1 footage from a 4.1K ∼APS-C region at up to 60p. It also has a 4:3 APS-C mode for use with anamorphic lenses. While this is a feature that can be purchased to upgrade the S5II, the S5II can’t add the other additional enhancements.

The S5IIX upgrades also include streaming options like the ability to broadcast directly to Facebook Live or YouTube via Wi-Fi to a smartphone. It can also use USB tethering to a phone or over a LAN cable.

While the S5IIX has the same dual memory card slots as the S5II that support SDXC cards and SD (UHS II) transfer speeds, because this isn’t sufficient for the camera’s 4K ProRes modes, the S5IIX can also record directly to an external SSD over its USB port. However, while the S5II has a tally lamp to signify recording, the S5IIX lacks this feature.

== Reception ==
Reviewers highlighted the S5II’s new hybrid phase-detect autofocus system as the biggest upgrade in this camera line. Some also really appreciated the unlimited video recording potential brought by the new internal fan. Cameralabs mentioned that the S5II is “arguably the best value new full-frame camera” at the time of its release, and PC Mag said that, “as a video camera, the S5II is practically peerless.”

The S5II has the same button layout as the S5 and reviewers noted that this reduced the learning curve if transitioning from one to the other. As a hybrid camera, it was described as capable for both photographs and video and recommended for users who want to do “a bit of everything.”

Some reviewers mentioned that its viewfinder resolution could be improved and that other cameras had better subject detection. Specifically for photography of moving subjects, the new autofocus didn’t meet every reviewer’s expectations, though it worked well for static subjects and video.
