= Pre-release capture =

Photographic technique

Pre-release capture (Nikon's name; also called Pre-continuous shooting (Canon), Pro capture (OM System), Pre-Capture (Sony), Pre-Shot ES (Fujifilm), and Pre-Burst (Panasonic)) is an option on digital cameras. It allows pre-recording of a number of images before the shutter button is fully depressed, along with a number of images after. This aids in capturing a picture of a fast-moving, unpredictable subject, such as a snake's tongue, a baby's smile, or a lightning bolt.

== How it operates ==
When the feature is active (which varies among camera manufacturers), the recording of potential shots begins with the shutter button being half-pressed. The camera begins capturing images at the selected fps rate for the selected pre-capture interval. This is commonly 15-30 fps for a period of 0.5-1.0 seconds. These images are kept in the camera's memory buffer, and not initially written to the memory card. Once the shots for the first interval have been taken, they are cyclically overwritten with newer images replacing the oldest until the photographer fully depresses the shutter button. At that time, the previous group of photos is written to the memory card. Depending on camera settings, while the shutter button remains depressed, additional images continue to be captured and saved at a pre-specified rate and duration.

== Advantages of using the technique ==
Advantages of using the pre-release capture technique include:

- It beats human reflexes in capturing sudden, unpredictable moments.
- Rather than fully holding down the shutter button constantly and filling up the memory card waiting for an event to happen, the photographer can wait for the event to occur and fully press the shutter button when the action occurs.
- The number of images to be buffered is customizable, with most cameras allowing a choice of the rate the pictures are taken and the time interval to capture.

== Disadvantages of using the technique ==
Disadvantages of using the pre-release capture technique include:

- Based on the camera, the images are usually restricted to JPEG. On a professional workflow, this can mean losing the dynamic range and shadow recovery flexibility that RAW files offer. Some top-of-the-line cameras with the feature allow for capturing RAW or JPEG, although most only capture JPEG.
- Based on the camera, there may be reductions in the resolution of the saved JPEG files.
- File management can be cumbersome, as the photographer must potentially cull through hundreds or thousands of almost identical images.
- Batteries can be quickly drained, as the camera's sensor, processor, and autofocus system are constantly running to maintain the rolling buffer.

== Cameras with the feature ==
Cameras that include the pre-release capture technique include:

- Nikon Z5II
- Nikon Z5IIC
- Nikon Z6III
- Nikon Z8
- Nikon Z9
- Nikon Zf
- Nikon Z50II
- Canon EOS R1
- Canon EOS R5 Mark II
- Canon EOS R6 Mark II
- Canon EOS R7
- Canon EOS R10
- Sony α1 II
- Sony α7 V
- Sony α7R VI
- Sony α9 III
- OM-1 System Mark II
- OM System OM-1
- OM System OM-1 Mark II
- OM System OM-5
- OM System Tough TG-6
- OM System Tough TG-7
- Olympus OM-D E-M1 Mark II
- Olympus OM-D E-M1 Mark III
- Olympus OM-D E-M5 Mark III
- Olympus OM-D E-M1X
- Panasonic Lumix DC-G9
- Panasonic Lumix DC-G9MII
- Panasonic Lumix DC-S5M2
- Panasonic Lumix DC-S5M2X
- Fujifilm X-E5
- Fujifilm X-H2
- Fujifilm X-H2S
- Fujifilm X-Pro3
- Fujifilm X-S10
- Fujifilm X-S20
- Fujifilm X-T3
- Fujifilm X-T4
- Fujifilm X-T5
- Fujifilm X-T30
- Fujifilm X-T30 II
- Fujifilm X-T50
- Fujifilm X100V
