= OM System Tough TG-7 =

Rugged compact camera released 2023

OM System Tough TG‑7

Overview
- Maker: OM Digital Solutions
- Released: September 13, 2023
- Intro price: US $549 (introductory)

Lens
- Lens: 4.5–18 mm (35 mm equivalent: 25–100 mm), f/2.0–f/4.9
- F-numbers: f/2.0 wide – f/4.9 tele

Sensor/medium
- Sensor: BSI‑CMOS
- Sensor size: 6.17 x 4.55 mm (1/2.3 in type)
- Maximum resolution: 4000 × 3000 (12 megapixels effective)
- Film speed: AUTO ISO: 100–1600 (customizable up to 12800); Manual ISO: 100–12800
- Recording medium: SD, SDHC, SDXC (UHS‑I support)

Focusing
- Focus: TTL contrast detection
- Focus modes: S‑AF, AF‑Tracking, MF
- Focus areas: 25 AF points
- Focus bracketing: Yes

Exposure/metering
- Exposure modes: Auto, program, aperture‑priority
- Exposure metering: Multi‑segment, spot
- Metering modes: Multi, spot

Flash
- Flash: Built‑in
- Flash exposure compensation: ±2 EV
- Flash bracketing: Yes

Shutter
- Frame rate: 20 fps (10 or 20 selectable)
- Shutter: 1/2–1/2000 s (Night Scene/A mode: up to 4 s)
- Shutter speeds: 4 s–1/2000 s
- Continuous shooting: 20 fps

Viewfinder
- Viewfinder magnification: 4× optical zoom

Image processing
- Image processor: Olympus TruePic VIII
- White balance: Yes

General
- Video recording: 4K @ 30p/25p, Full HD up to 120 fps
- LCD screen: Colour LCD, 3 inches with 1,040,000 dots
- Battery: LI‑92B Li‑ion battery (approx. 330 shots)
- AV port: Micro HDMI (Type D)
- Data port(s): USB 2.0 (USB‑C), Wi‑Fi (IEEE 802.11 b/g/n), Bluetooth 4.2, GPS/Galileo/QZSS
- Body features: IPX8 waterproof to 15 m, IP6X dustproof, shockproof (2.1 m drop), freezeproof to −10 °C, crushproof to 100 kg
- Dimensions: 113.9×65.8×32.7 mm (4.48×2.59×1.29 in)
- Weight: 249 g (with battery and card)

The OM System Tough TG‑7 is a rugged compact camera introduced by OM Digital Solutions (formerly Olympus) on 13 September 2023. It builds on the TG‑6 platform with enhancements such as vertical video support, interval shooting, USB‑C connectivity, and a new "Construction Mode", while retaining full compatibility with TG‑5/TG‑6 accessories and the TruePic VIII processor.

The TG‑7 improves macro performance with its Variable Macro System, offering effective magnification up to 7× and focus as close as 1 cm from the lens edge (microscope mode), along with support for RAW capture. Video is enhanced with support for vertical 4K recording and time‑lapse generation. Ruggedness specifications remain IPX8 waterproof to 15 m, shockproof from 2.1 m drops, dustproof to IP6X, freezeproof to −10 °C, and crushproof up to 100 kg, and it integrates a Field Sensor System for location and environmental data.

As in the OM System Tough TG-7. Pro Capture is supported.
