= Olympus Tough TG-5 =

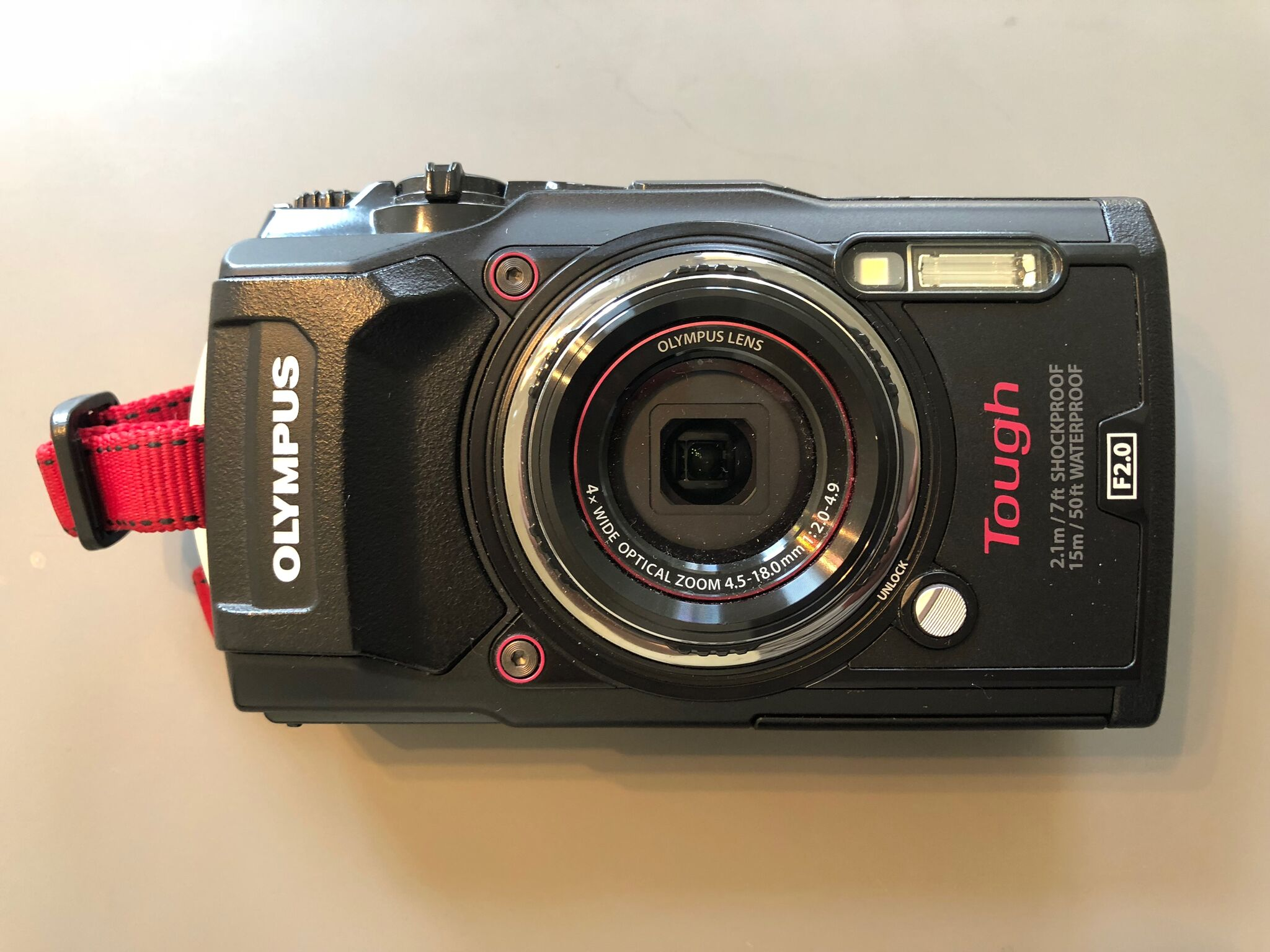

Overview
- Maker: Olympus Corporation

Lens
- Lens: 4.5-18mm (35mm equivalent: 25-100mm)
- F-numbers: f/2.0 wide - f/4.9 tele (35mm equivalent: f/11.1 wide - f/27.2 tele)

Sensor/medium
- Sensor type: BSI-CMOS
- Sensor size: 6.17 x 4.55mm (1/2.3 inch type)
- Maximum resolution: 4000 x 3000 (12 megapixels)
- Film speed: AUTO ISO: 100 ‐ 1600 with customizable upper limit from 100 to 12800 Manual ISO: 100 - 12800 (adjustable)
- Recording medium: SD, SDHC, SDXC, Eye-Fi Card compatible

Focusing
- Focus bracketing: Yes

Shutter
- Shutter speeds: 1/2 - 1/2000 sec. (Night Scene, A mode: up to 4 sec.)
- Continuous shooting: 20 fps with selectable 10/20 fps

Viewfinder
- Viewfinder magnification: 4x Optical zoom

Image processing
- Image processor: Olympus TruePic™ VIII
- White balance: Yes

General
- Video recording: 4K at 30p and HD at 120fps
- LCD screen: Colour LCD, 3 inches with 460,000 dots
- Battery: LI-92B Li-ion battery
- AV port(s): Micro HDMI (Type D)
- Data port(s): Built-in (IEEE 802.11 b/g/n), USB 2.0 (Micro-B)
- Body features: Hermetically sealed. Waterproof rating is now 15m. Can be dropped from 2.1m/7ft. It's also freezeproof to -10°C/+14°F and dustproof.
- Dimensions: W: 4.43 in H: 2.6 in D: 1.23 in
- Weight: Approx. 250 g (with battery and memory card, based on CIPA standards) (0.55 lb / 8.72 oz)

The Olympus Tough TG-5 is a weatherised digital compact camera announced by Olympus Corporation on May 17, 2017. It differs from its predecessor, the Olympus Tough TG-4, by including a new sensor and processor, advanced tracking capabilities, and 4K video capture.

The TG-5 is technically very similar to the Olympus TG-4. The physical dimensions (length x width x depth) of the TG-4 and the TG-5 are identical. In May 2019, the camera was superseded by the Olympus Tough TG-6.
