= JPE =

JPE may refer to:

- The Journal of Political Economy, a leading economics journal published by the University of Chicago
- The Journal of Political Ecology, a leading interdisciplinary journal published by the University of Arizona
- The Journal of Photonics for Energy
- .jpe (file extension) for JPEG images
- JPE (assembly language) instruction for jump if parity even, see x86 instruction listings
- Joint Planning Environment of the U.S. Joint Planning and Development Office
- Jonathan Palmer Evolution, a car produced by Caterham Cars
- Juan Ponce Enrile, Filipino politician
- Japanese Pidgin English

== See also ==
- JPEG (disambiguation)
- JPG (disambiguation)
