= CJPE =

CJPE may refer to:

- Canadian Journal of Program Evaluation (French: Revue Canadienne d'Évaluation de Programme), a professional journal
- CJPE-FM 99.3 MHz, Picton, Ontario, Canada; a radio station

== See also ==
- WJTE-LP 98.5 MHz, East Berstadt, Kentucky, USA; a low-power radio station
- JPE (disambiguation)
