= Panasonic Lumix DC-S1 =

Panasonic LUMIX DC-S1 series
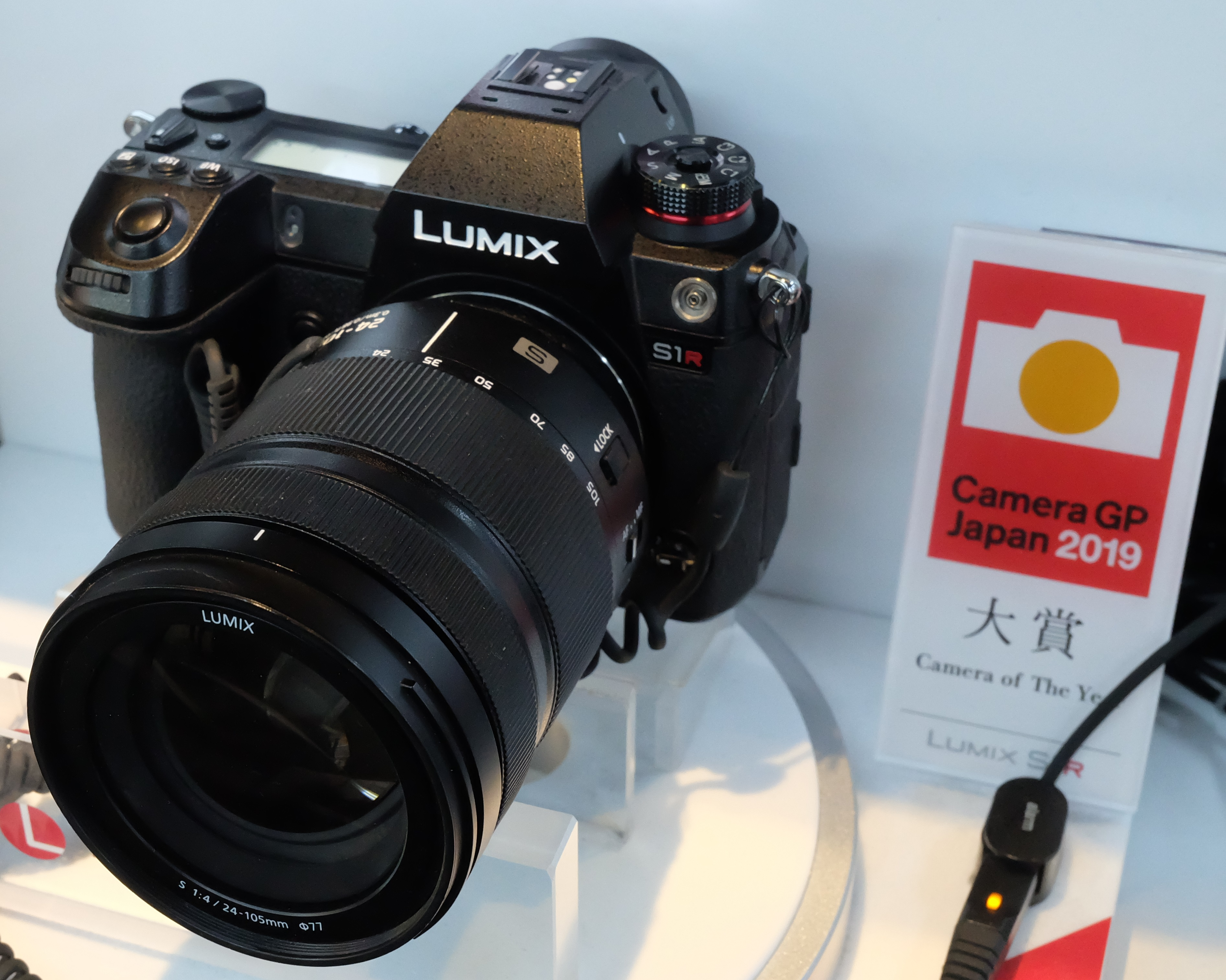
- DC-S1R with Camera Grand Prix 2019 award plaque

Overview
- Maker: Panasonic
- Type: Mirrorless
- Released: S1, S1R: 23 March 2019 (7 years ago); S1H: 25 September 2019 (6 years ago); BS1H: 16 December 2021 (4 years ago) Made-to-Order

Lens
- Lens mount: Leica L-mount

Sensor/medium
- Sensor type: CMOS without low-pass filter
- Sensor size: Full-frame (36 × 24 mm)
- Sensor maker: Sony
- Maximum resolution: S1: 6000 × 4000 (24.2 megapixels); S1R: 8368 × 5584 (47.3 megapixels); S1H, BS1H: 6000 × 4000 (24.2 megapixels)
- Film speed: S1: 100 - 51200 (standard) 50 - 204800 (expand); S1R: 100 - 25600 (standard) 50 - 51200 (expand); S1H, BS1H: 100 - 51200 (standard) 50 - 204800 (expand)
- Recording medium: XQD card, SDXC card, each 1 slot BS1H: SDXC dual slot

Focusing
- Focus areas: 225 points

Shutter
- Shutter speeds: 1/8000 sec - 60 sec (S1R: maximum 1/16000sec by electronic shutter)
- Continuous shooting: 9 fps

Viewfinder
- Viewfinder magnification: 0.78
- Frame coverage: 100%

Image processing
- Image processor: Venus Engine
- White balance: yes

General
- LCD screen: S1, S1R: 3.2 inch, 2.1 dots touchscreen, 3-way tilting; S1H: 3.2 inch, 2.3 dots touchscreen, variable angle; BS1H: none
- Battery: DMW-BLJ31; USB-PD rechargeable
- AV port(s): USB3.1 Type-C, micro HDMI
- Data port(s): IEEE 802.11 a/b/g/n/ac, Wi-fi, Bluetooth Low Energy
- Body features: In-body image stabilization (B.I.S. or IBIS)
- Dimensions: S1, S1R: 148.9 × 110 × 96.7 mm (5.86 × 4.33 × 3.81 in); S1H: 151 × 114.2 × 110.4 mm (5.94 × 4.50 × 4.35 in); BS1H: 148.9 × 110 × 96.7 mm (5.86 × 4.33 × 3.81 in)
- Weight: S1, S1R: 1,017 g (2.242 lb) (including battery and SD card); S1H: 1,164 g (2.566 lb) (including battery and SD card); BS1H: 585 g (1.290 lb) (body only)
- Made in: PR China

Chronology
- Successor: Panasonic Lumix DC-S5 and Panasonic Lumix DC-S1M2 series

The Panasonic Lumix DC-S1 is a mirrorless camera that Panasonic announced on September 25, 2018, and released on March 23, 2019. It was the company's first digital camera to feature a full-frame sensor. The "LUMIX S series" was named as a "specialized model" designed for professional use, offering high image quality, functionality, and ruggedness.

It adopted the Leica L-Mount based on the "L-Mount Alliance" jointly announced by Leica, Panasonic, and Sigma Corporation on September 25, 2018. Panasonic's development team determined that the L-Mount offered advantages for both still photography and video; by leveraging the large camera body, they were able to incorporate excellent operability and powerful features.

The DC-S1 (featuring a 24.2-megapixel sensor) and the DC-S1R (featuring a 47.3-megapixel sensor) were released simultaneously on March 23, 2019. Additionally, the DC-S1H—equipped with a vari-angle LCD and enhanced video recording capabilities—was released on September 25, 2019, followed on December 16, 2021, by the DC-BS1H, a box-style camera dedicated to video recording that was sold on a made-to-order basis.

The DC-S1R won Camera Grand Prix Camera of the Year 2019.

== Galleries ==
=== DC-S1 model ===
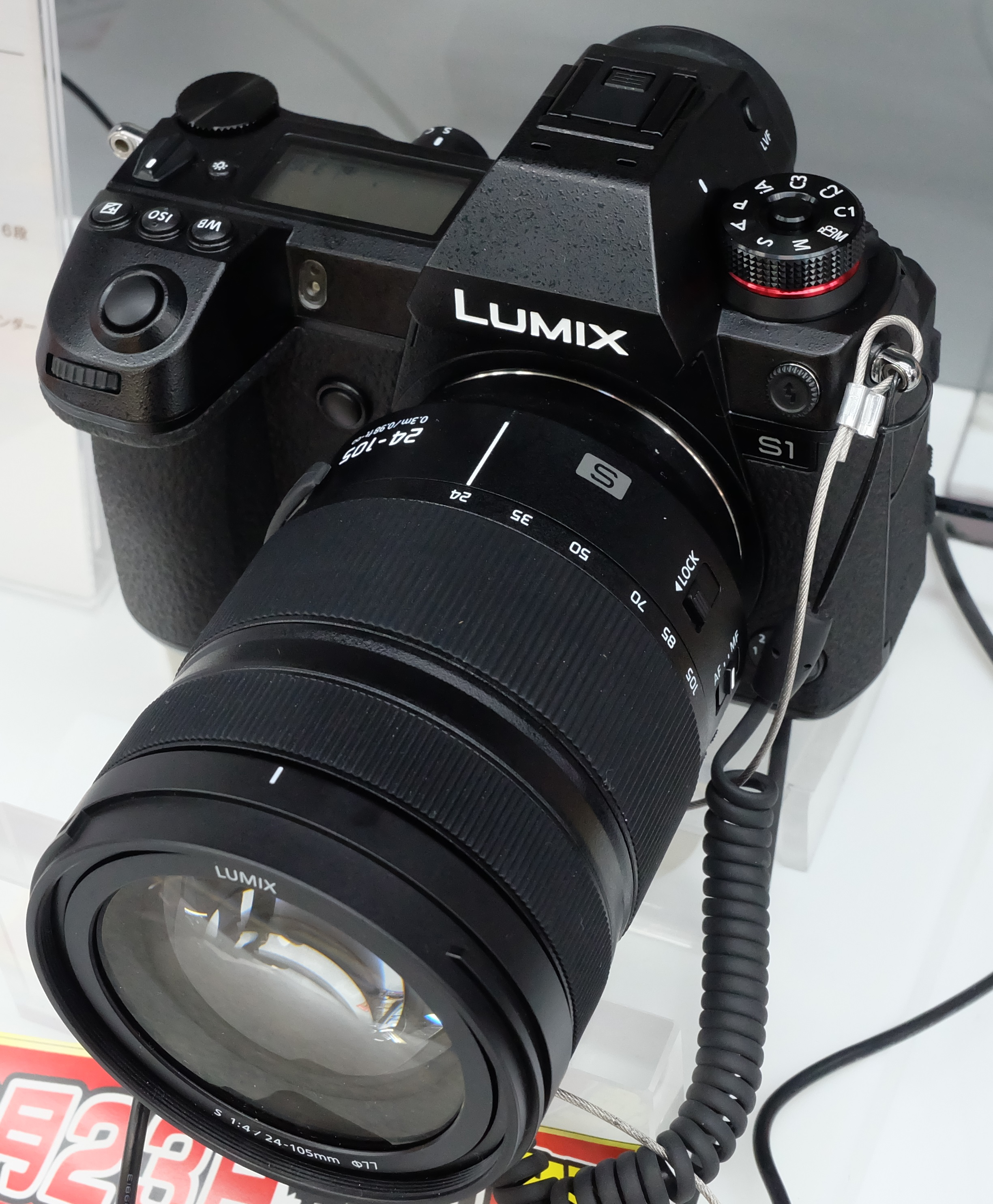

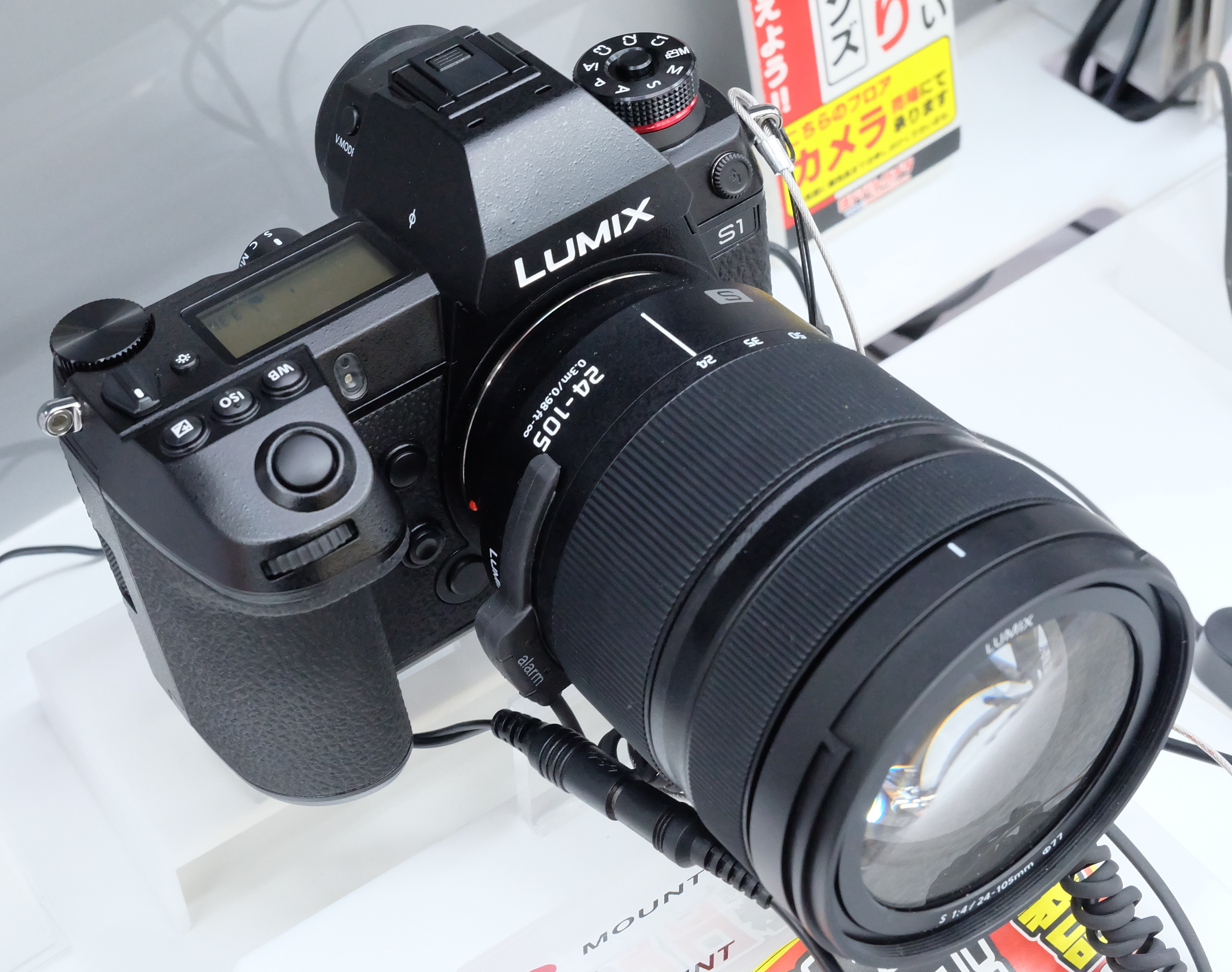

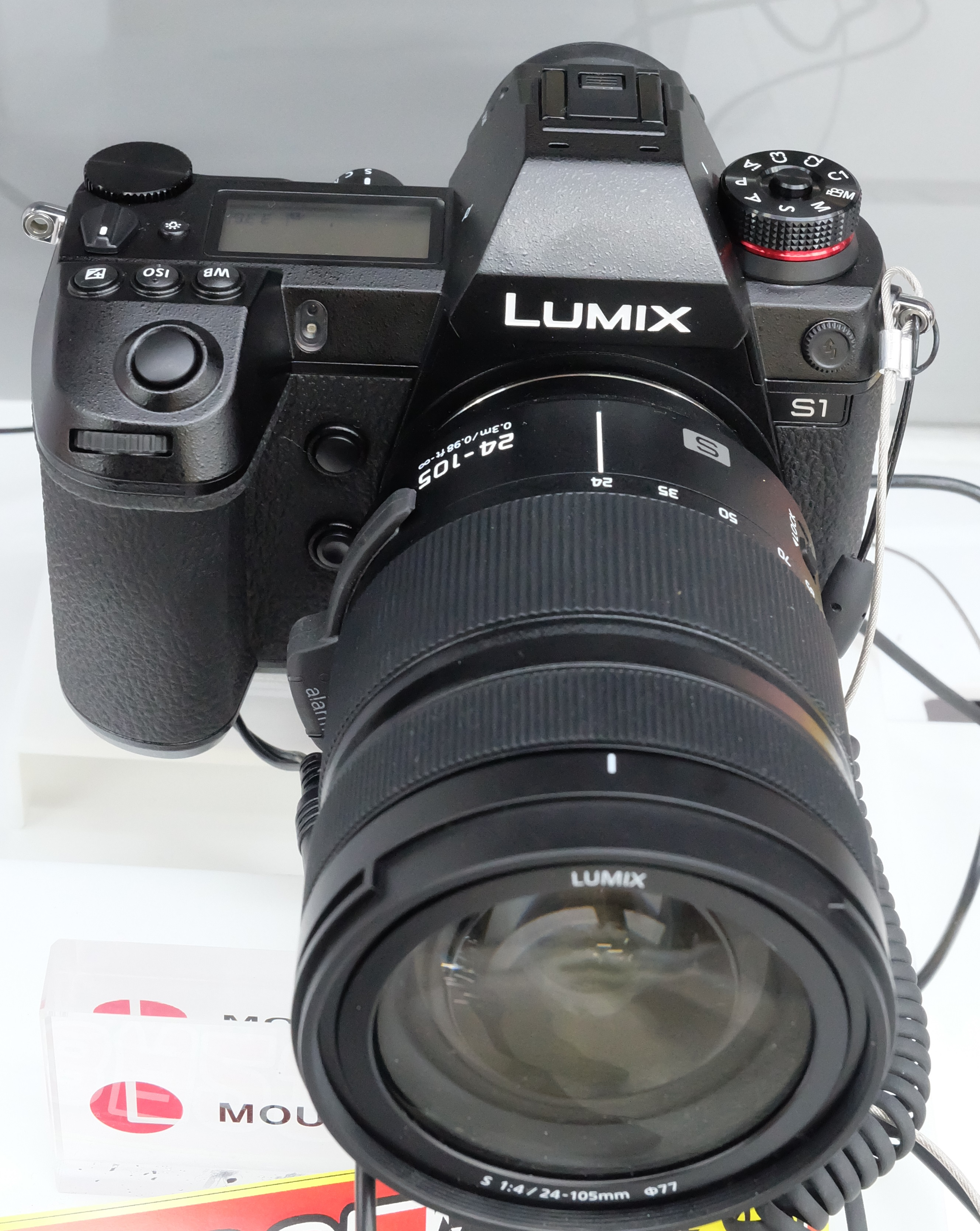

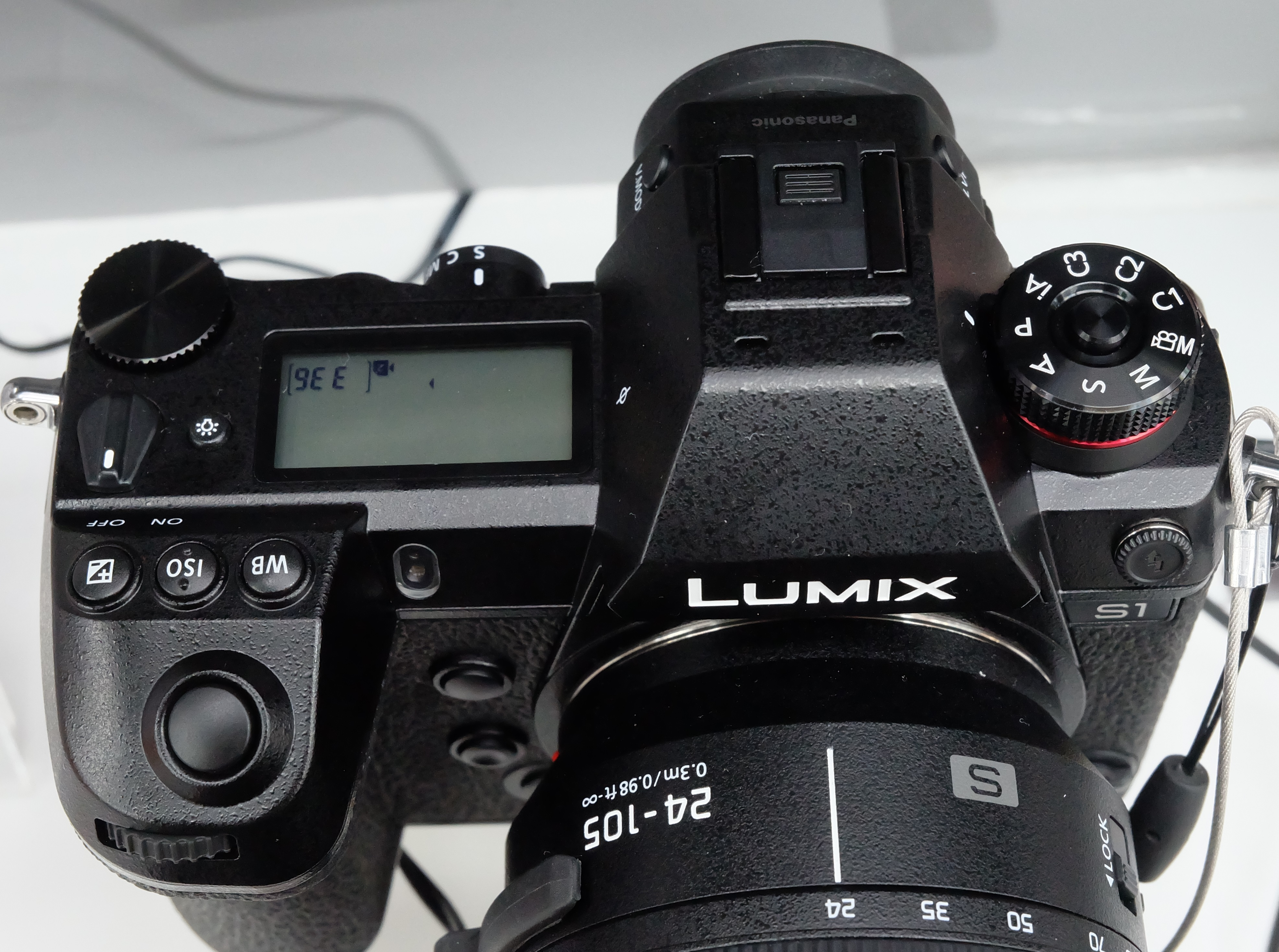

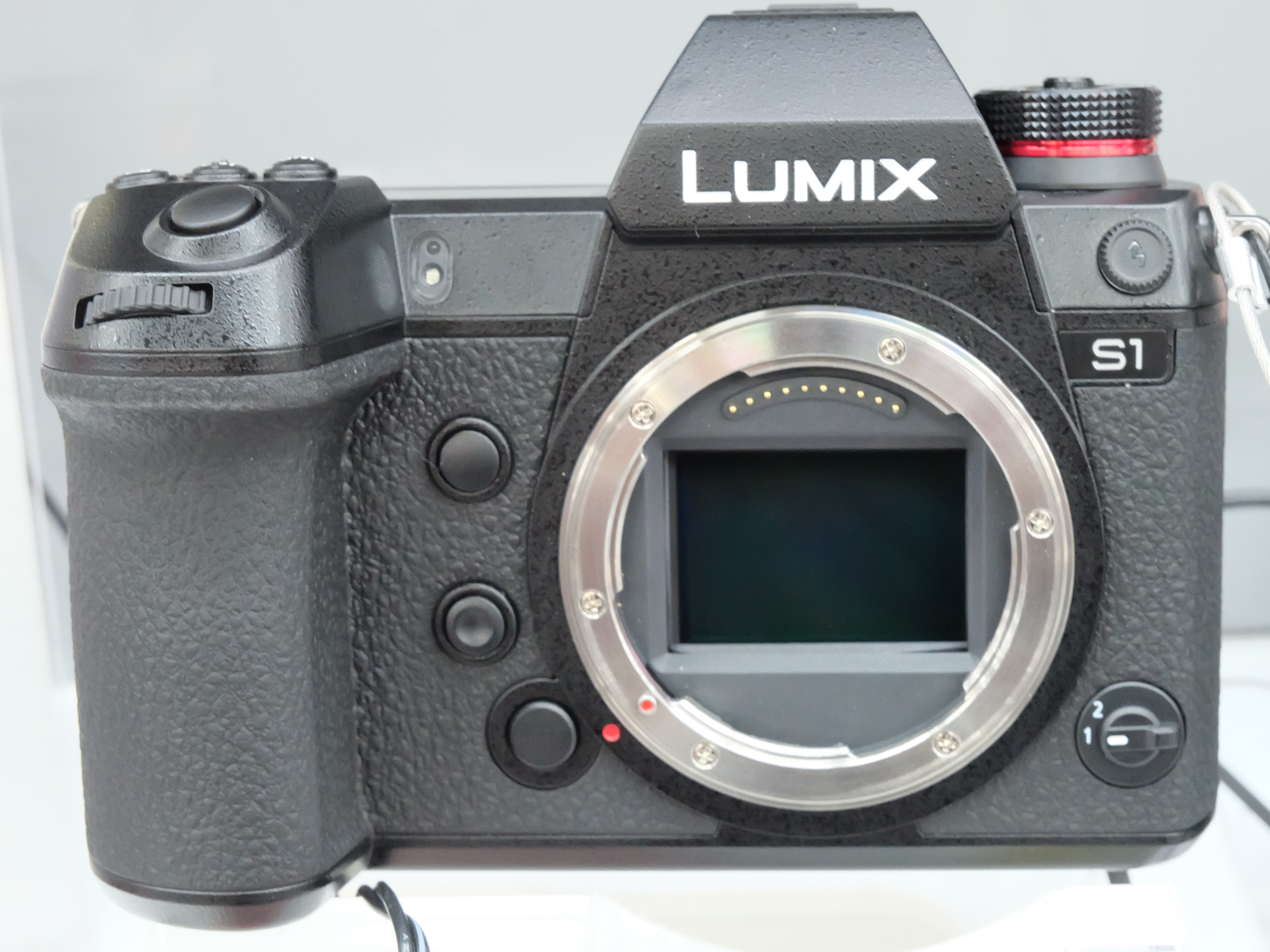

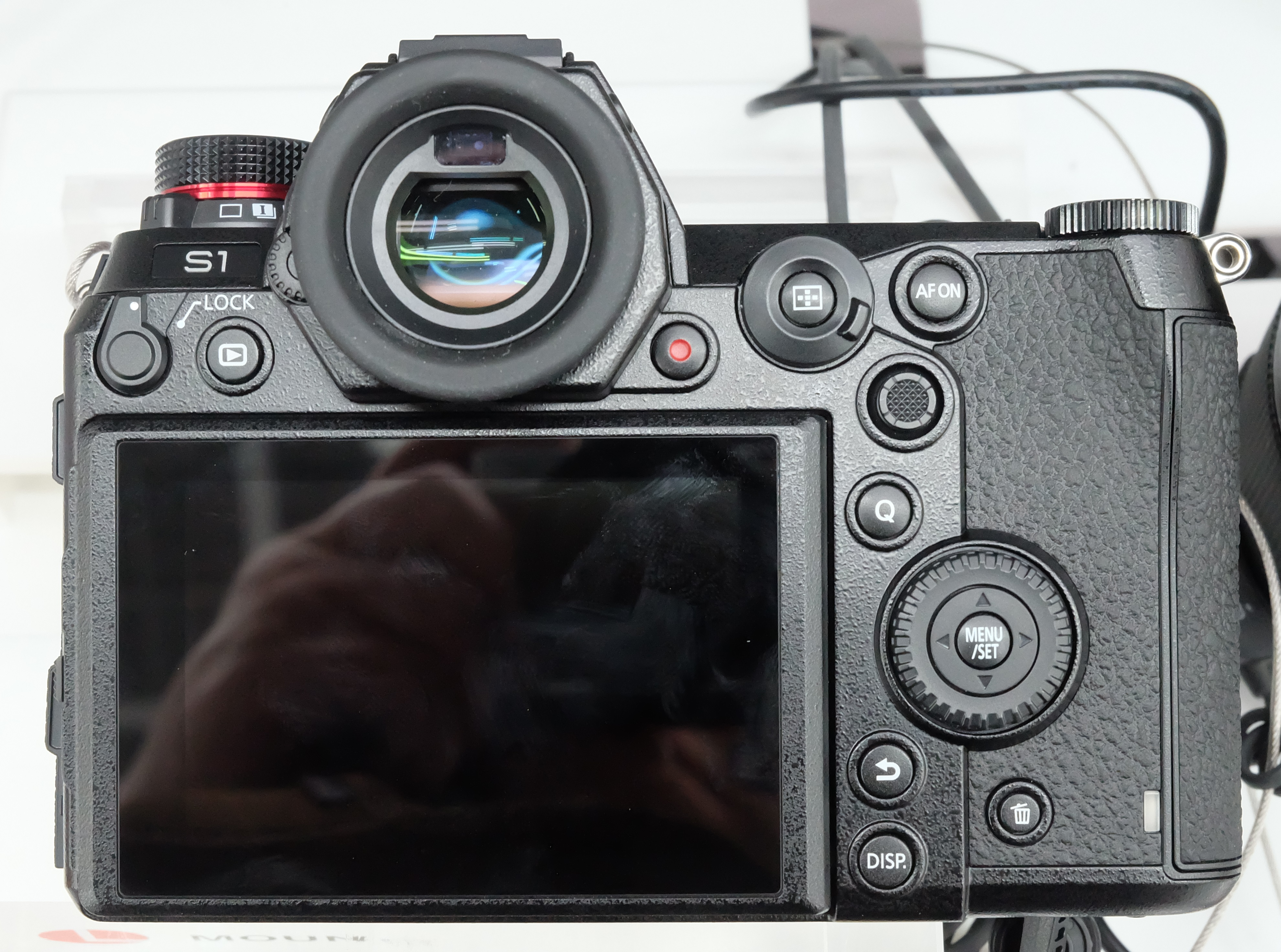

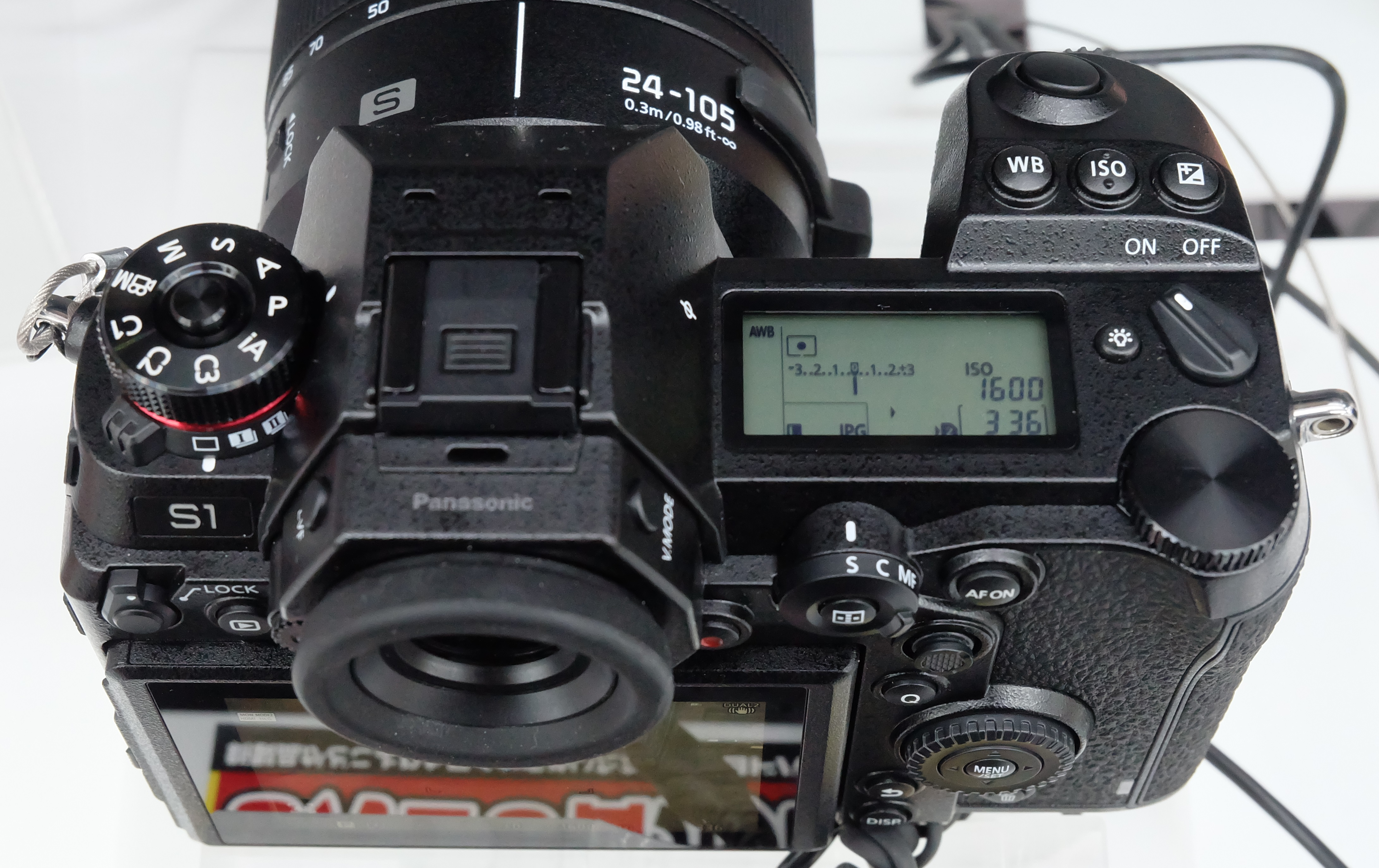

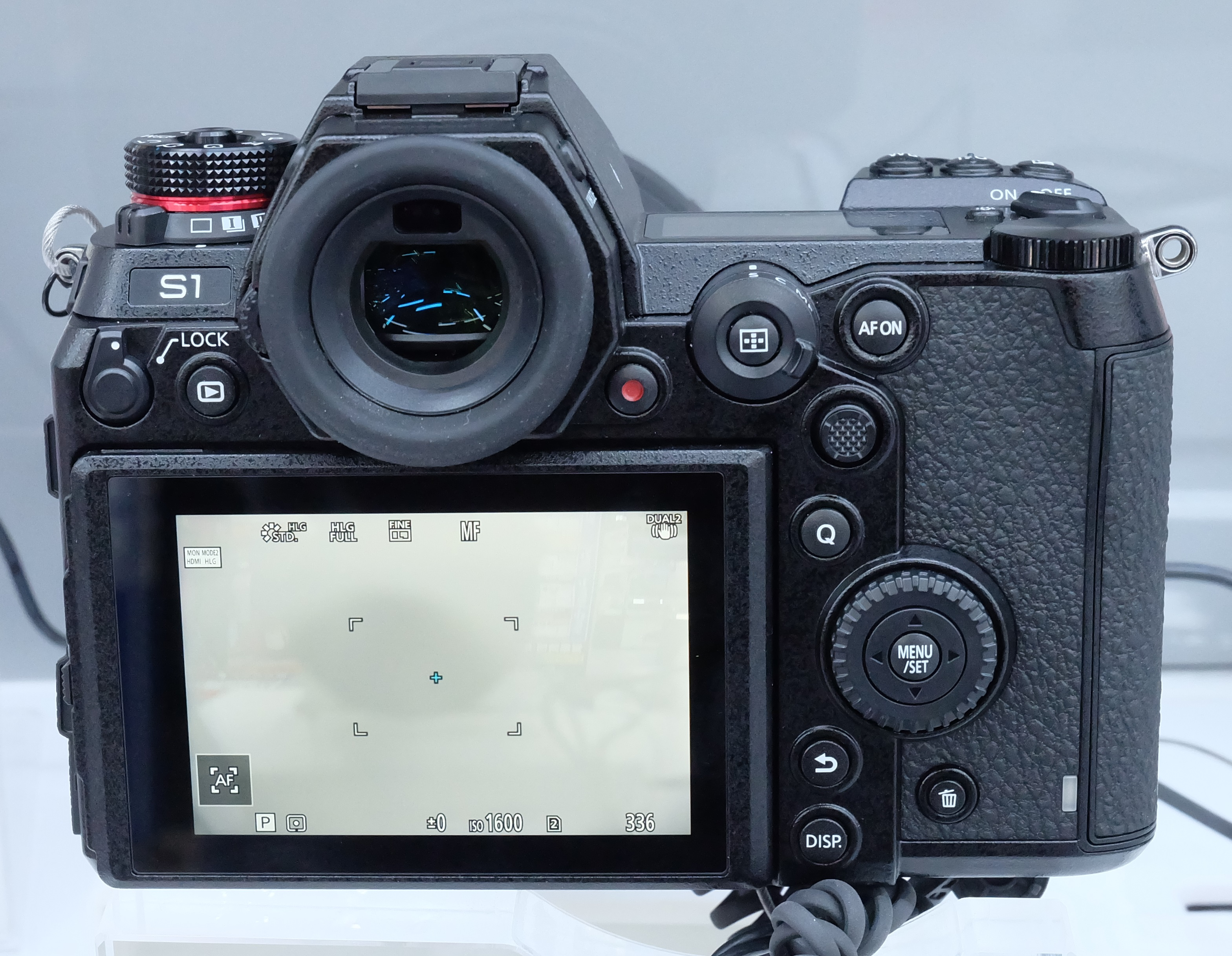

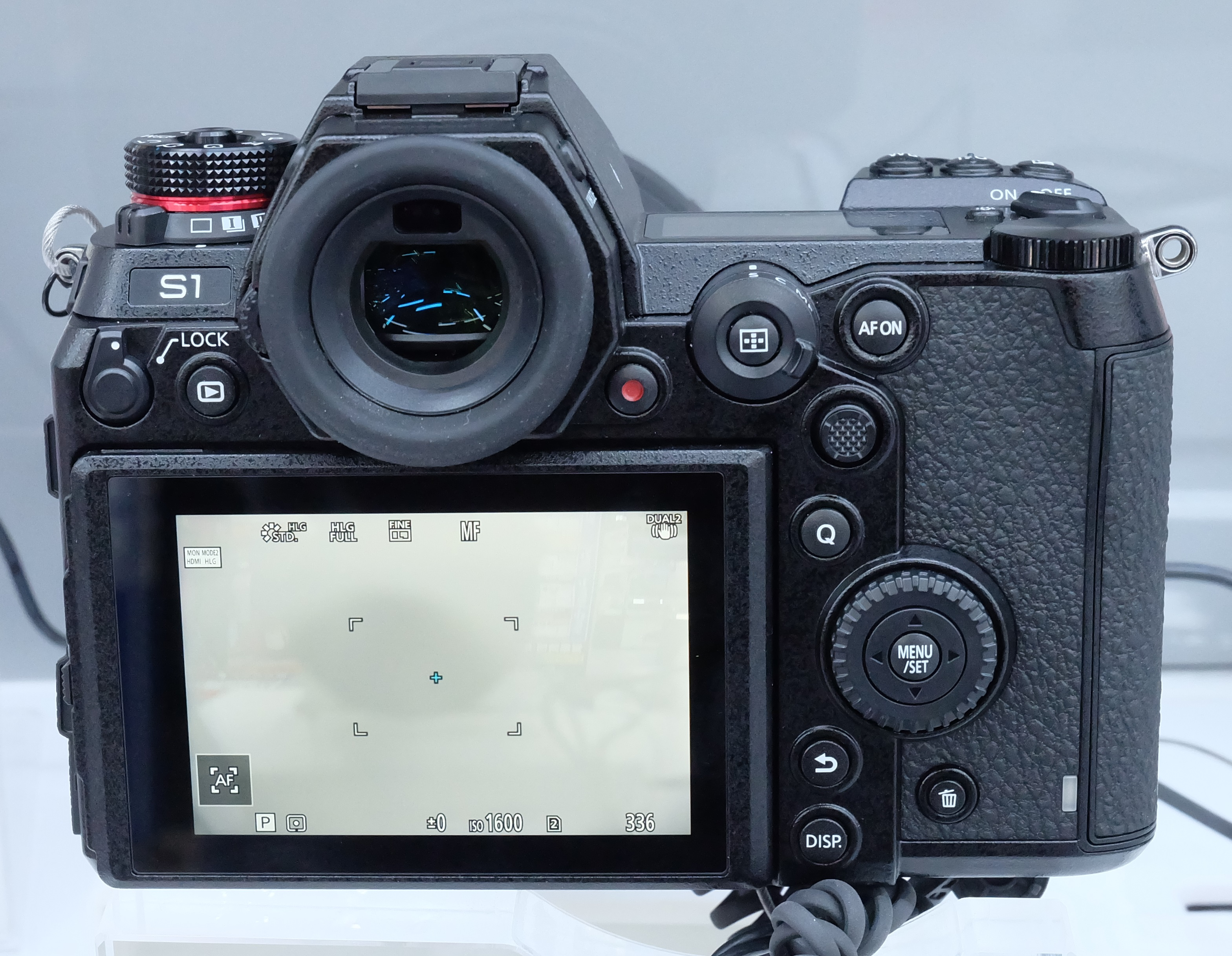

=== DC-S1H model ===
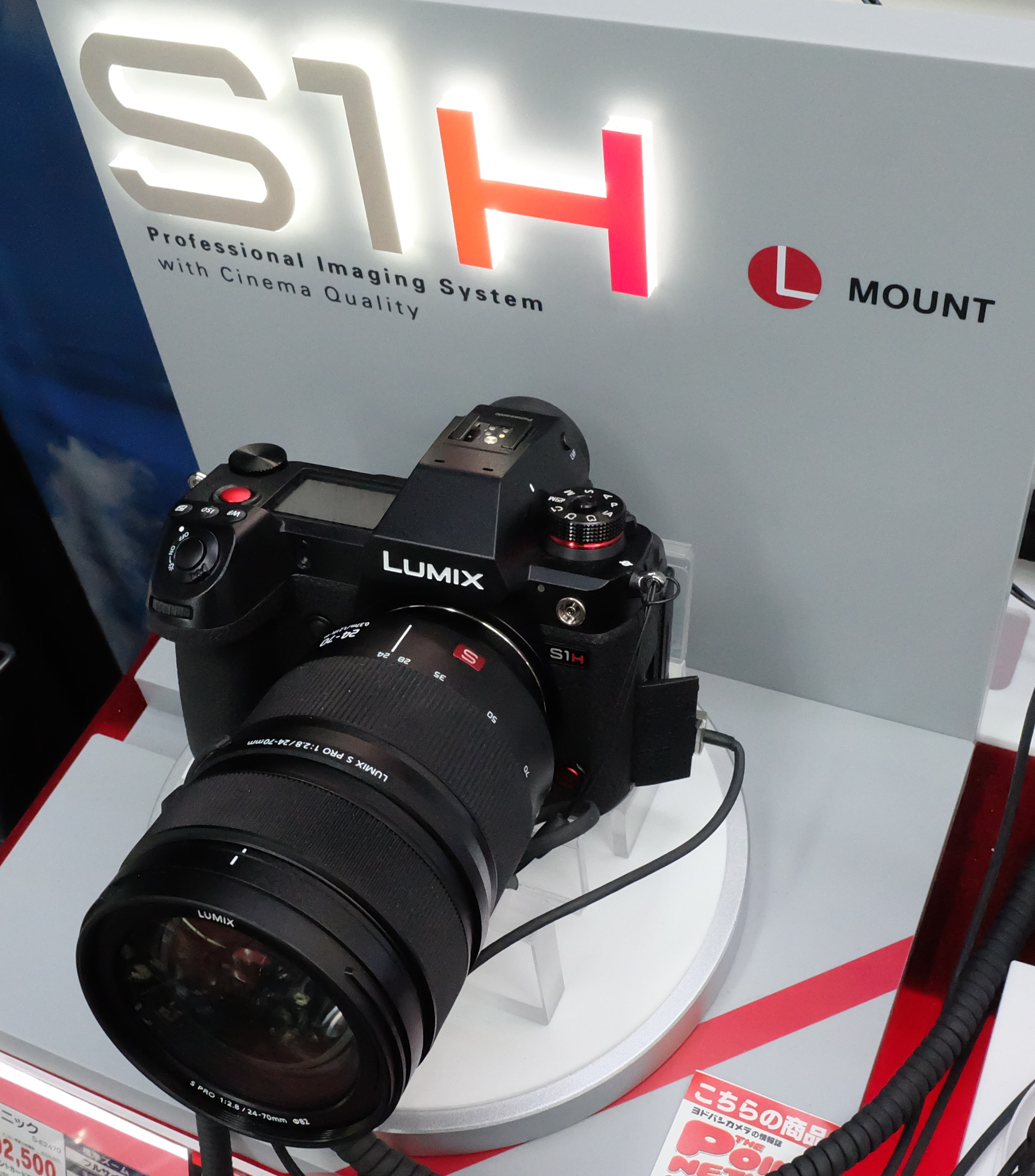
DC-S1H

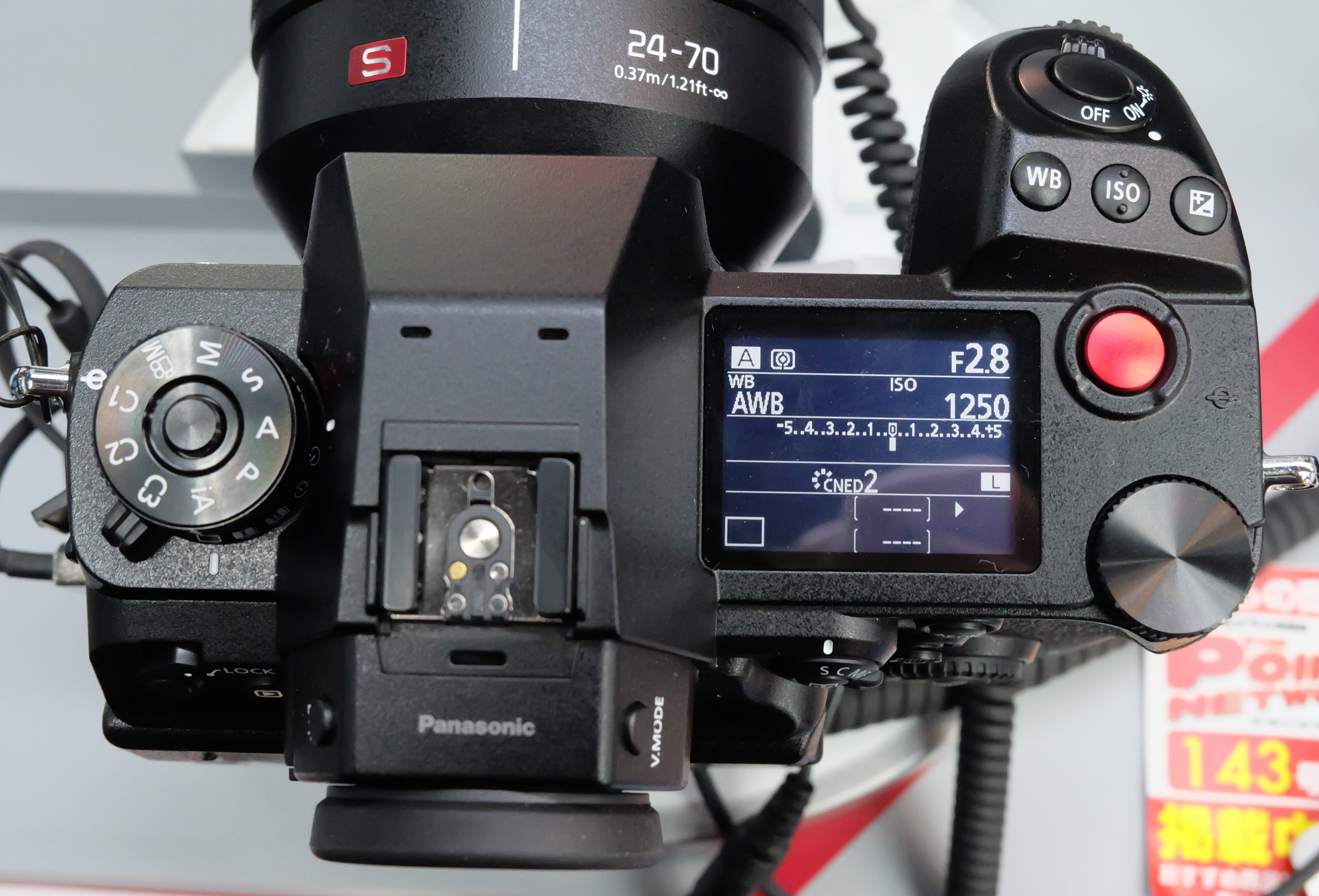
DC-S1H

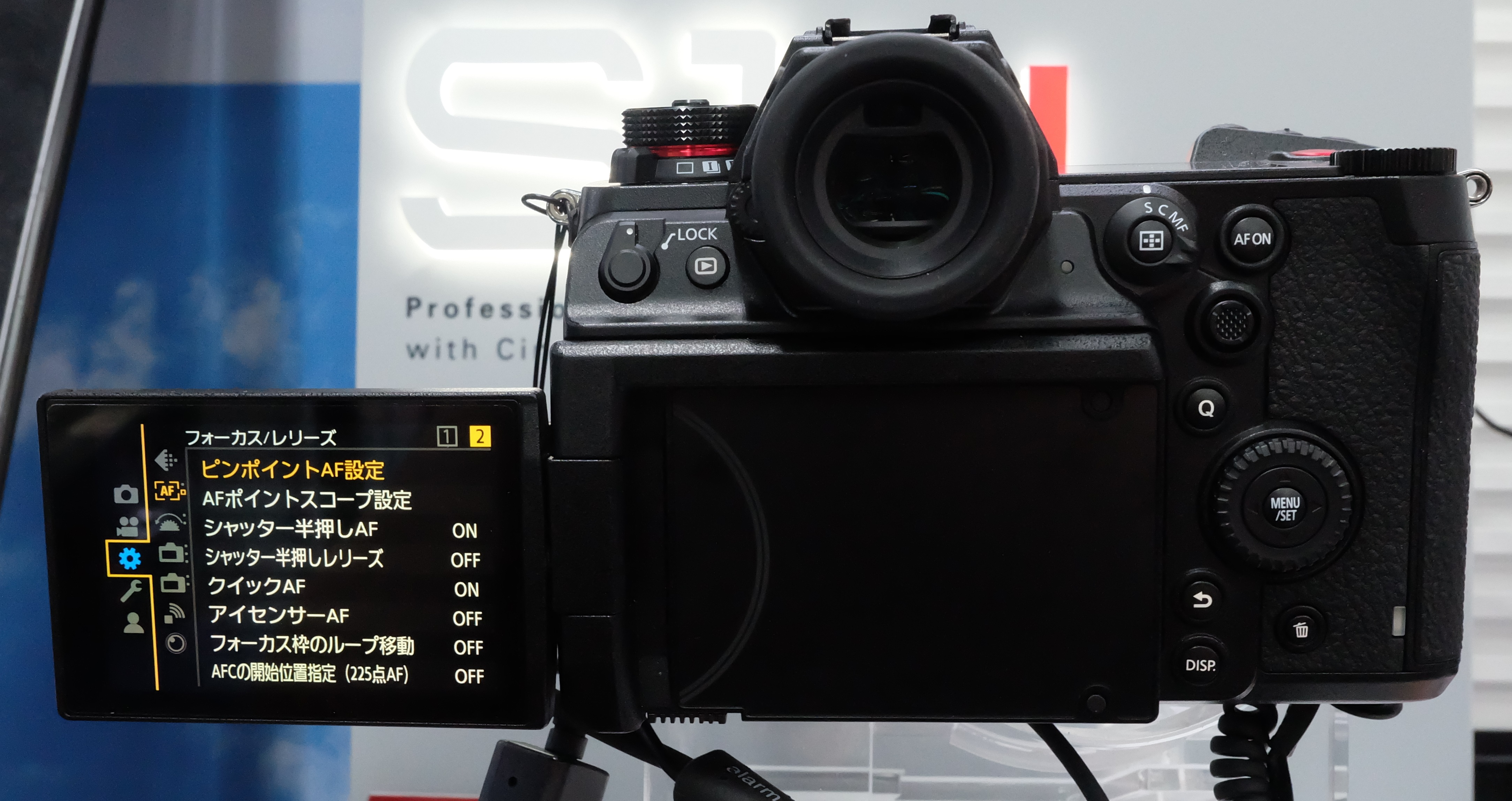
DC-S1H

=== DC-BS1H model ===
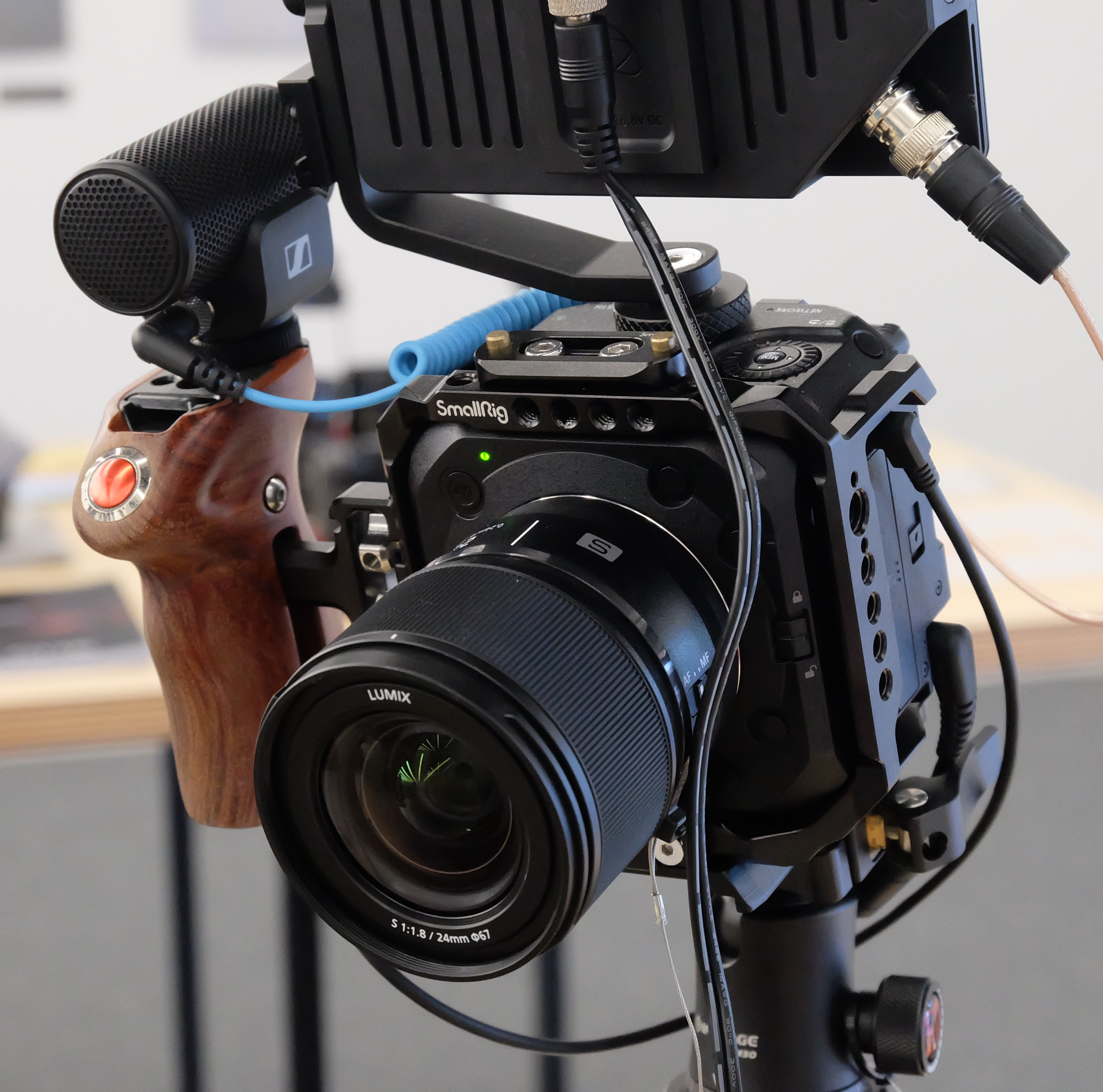
DC-BS1H

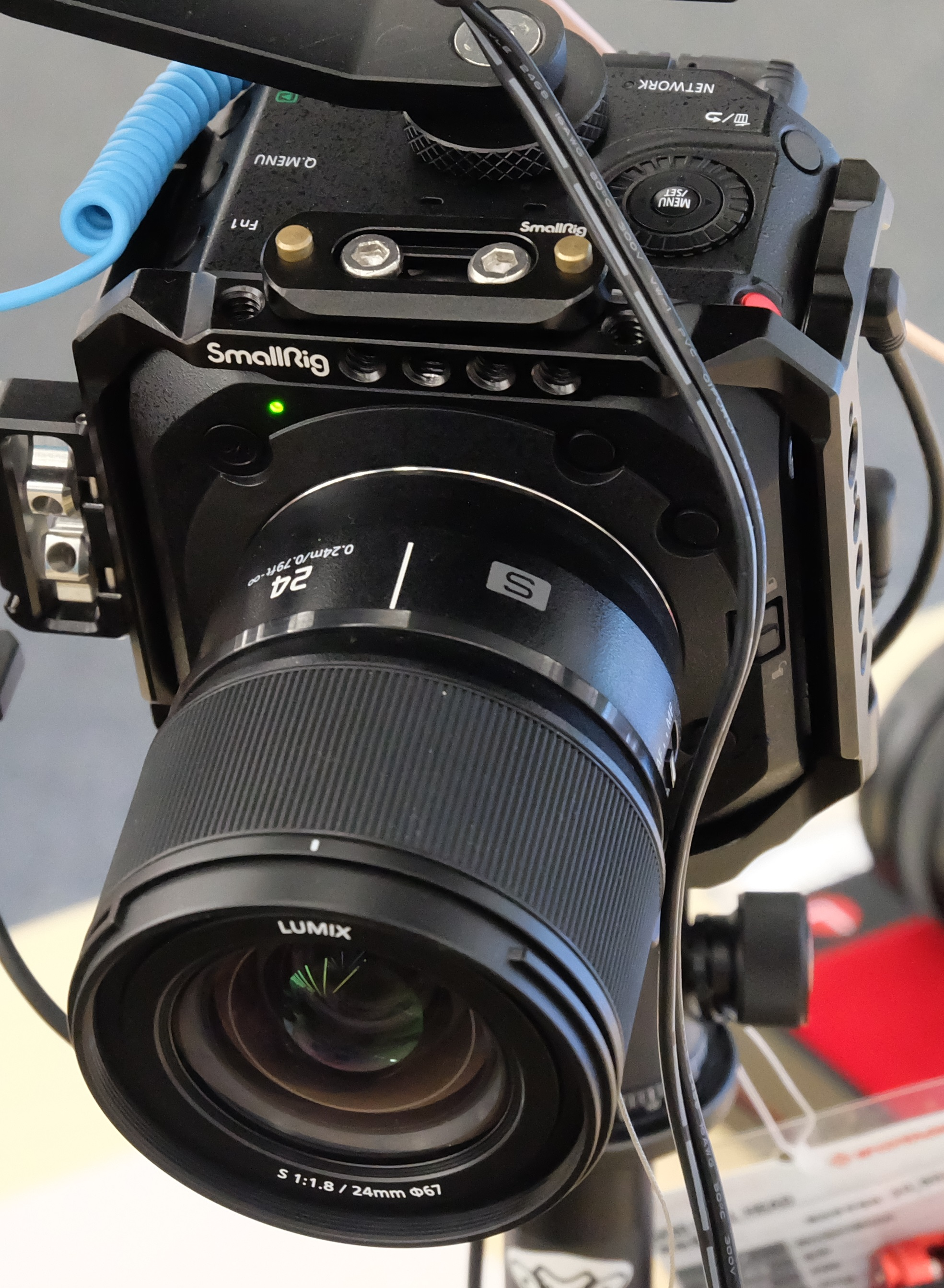
DC-BS1H

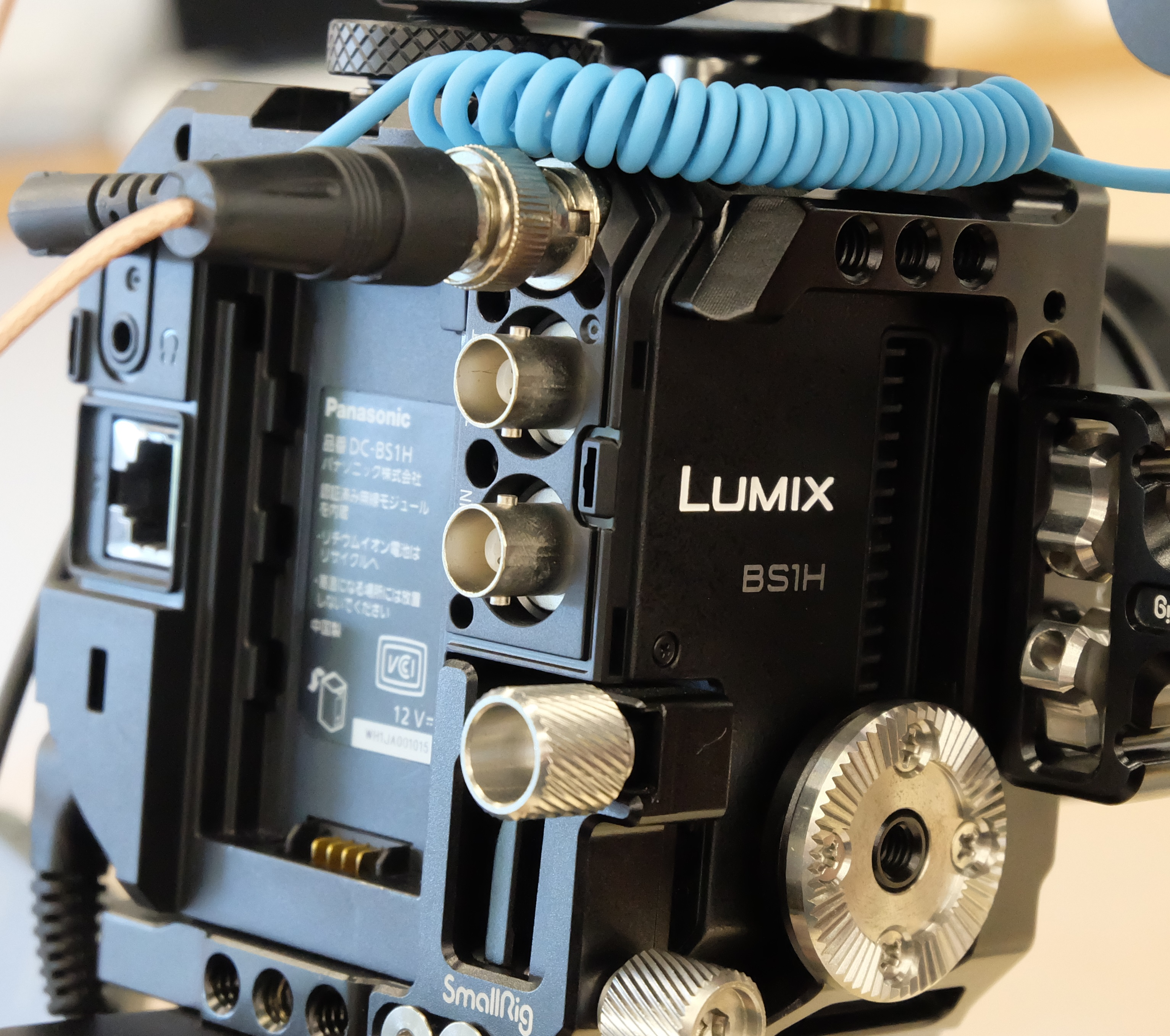
DC-BS1H
