= Panasonic Lumix DC-S1M2 =

Panasonic LUMIX DC-S1M2
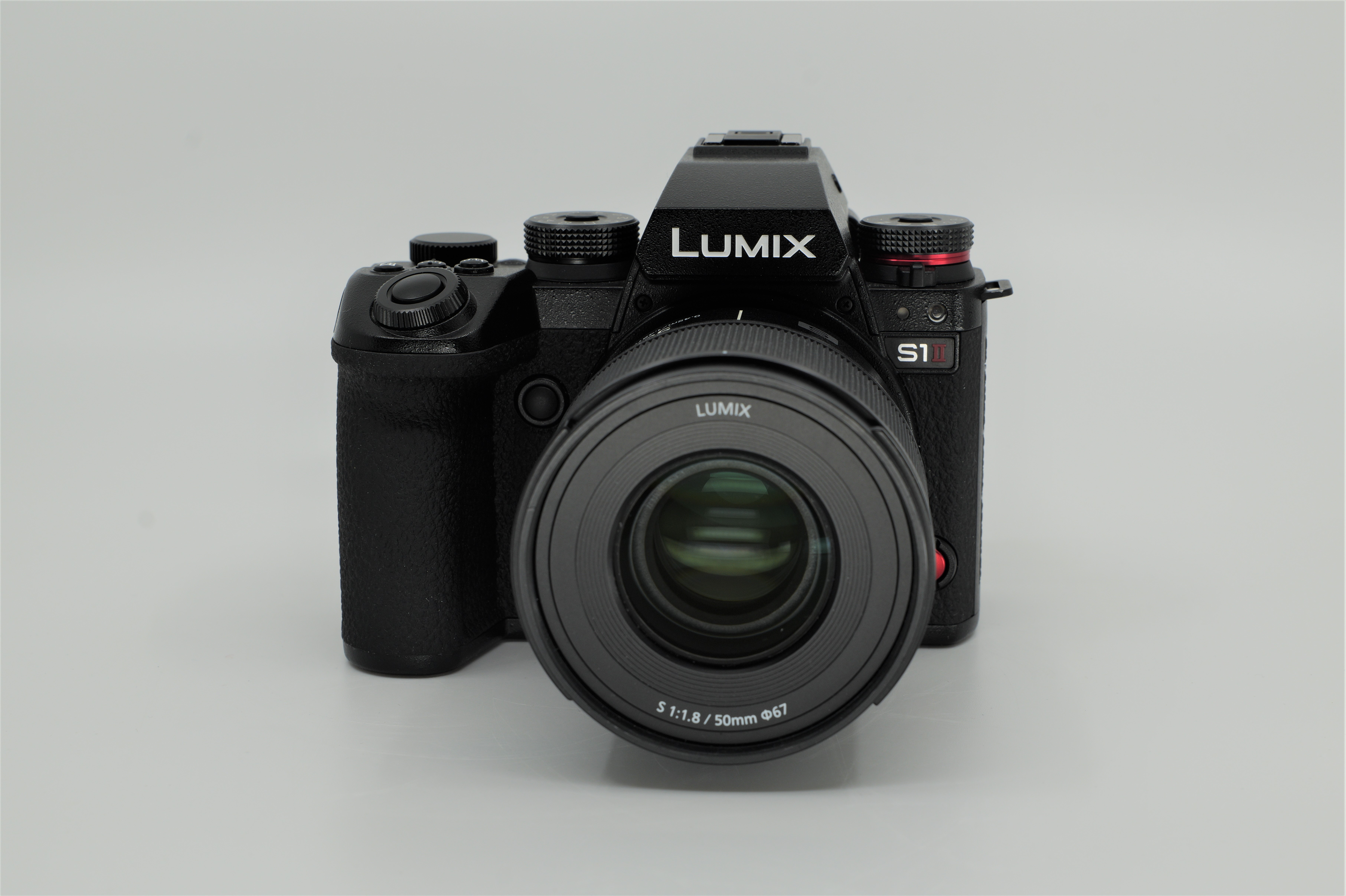

Overview
- Maker: Panasonic Corporation
- Released: 26 June 2025; 16 months ago
- Intro price: JPY 455,400

Lens
- Lens mount: Leica L-Mount
- Lens: L-Mount system
- Compatible lenses: L-Mount lenses

Sensor/medium
- Sensor: BSI-CMOS sensor
- Sensor size: 35.6 × 23.8 mm (full-frame)
- Sensor maker: Sony Semiconductor Manufacturing Corporation
- Maximum resolution: 24.2 megapixels (6000 × 4000)
- Film speed: ISO 100–51,200
- Recording medium: CFexpress Type B and SD (UHS-II) each 1 slot

Focusing
- Focus modes: AFS (Single), AFC (Continuous), MF
- Focus areas: Phase Hybrid AF with multiple selectable AF points
- Focus bracketing: Yes

Exposure/metering
- Exposure: TTL metering
- Exposure bracketing: Yes
- Exposure modes: Program (P), Aperture Priority (A), Shutter Priority (S), Manual (M), Custom modes
- Exposure metering: Multi-pattern, Center-weighted, Spot
- Metering modes: Multiple / Center-weighted / Spot / Highlight-weighted

Flash
- Flash: Hot shoe
- Flash exposure compensation: Yes
- Flash synchronization: Up to 1/250 sec (mechanical shutter)
- Flash bracketing: Yes
- Compatible flashes: Panasonic external flashes (e.g., DMW series)

Shutter
- Frame rate: Up to 30 fps
- Shutter: Mechanical focal-plane shutter and electronic shutter
- Shutter speed range: Mechanical: approx. 60–1/8000 sec Electronic: up to 1/16,000 sec
- Shutter speeds: Bulb (up to 30 min), 60–1/8000 sec (mechanical)
- Continuous shooting: Up to 30 fps (electronic), lower with mechanical

Viewfinder
- Viewfinder: Electronic viewfinder (OLED)
- Viewfinder magnification: 0.78×
- Frame coverage: Approx. 100%

Image processing
- Image processor: Venus Engine with L2 Technology
- White balance: Auto, Preset (Daylight, Cloudy, Shade, etc.), Kelvin, Custom
- WB bracketing: Yes
- Dynamic range bracketing: Yes
- Dynamic range compressor: Yes

General
- Video recording: 6K (approx. 5952×3968) up to 30p 5.9K up to 60p 4K (3840×2160) up to 120p Full HD (1920×1080) up to 240p Internal 10-bit recording; high bitrate options depending on codec (All-Intra and LongGOP options available)
- LCD screen: 3.0-inch vari-angle touchscreen LCD, 1.8M-dot resolution
- Battery: DMW-BLK22 Li-ion battery USB-PD rechargeable
- Optional battery packs: Battery grip (DMW series)
- Optional accessories: Battery grip, external microphone, XLR adapter, remote shutter release, L-Mount lenses
- AV port(s): HDMI (Type A), USB-C
- Data port(s): USB-C, Wi-Fi, Bluetooth
- Body features: Magnesium alloy body, dust/splash/freeze resistant
- Dimensions: 148.9×110×96.7 mm (5.86×4.33×3.81 in)
- Weight: 800 g (28 oz) (1.8 lb) including battery and memory card
- Made in: PR China

Chronology
- Predecessor: Panasonic Lumix DC-S1 series

The Panasonic LUMIX DC-S1M2 (also known as the LUMIX S1 II) is a digital, full frame mirrorless interchangeable-lens camera released by Panasonic in 2025 as part of the LUMIX S series. It uses a 24.1 MP full-frame partially stacked CMOS sensor and is designed as a hybrid model that has a wide range of features for both still photography and video production. The camera offers blackout free burst shooting at up to 70 frames per second with continuous autofocus, in body image stabilization, and phase detect hybrid autofocus with subject detection. Its stabilization is rated up to eight stops and is considered best in class. It supports high resolution recording formats including 6K and 5.1K open gate video and oversampled 4K up to 60p, as well as 4K at 120p with a small crop.

The S1II is the first Panasonic, and second mirrorless camera (after the Nikon Z6III), to use a 24-megapixel partially stacked sensor. It is the successor to the LUMIX S1 that was released in 2019.

The Panasonic LUMIX S1IIE (also known as the LUMIX DC-S1M2ES) is released in 2025 is similar. It uses a 24 MP full-frame sensor and is designed as a hybrid model for both still photography and video production. The “E” stands for “Essential”, as this camera includes only the essential features of the LUMIX S1II.

The Panasonic Lumix S1RII (also known as the LUMIX DC-S1RII) is similar, but introduced faster phase-detect autofocus and improved 8K video capabilities. It also improved stabilization, and also has a smaller and lighter body than its predecessor. The camera debuted a 44.3 MP back-side illuminated CMOS sensor. This camera is designed as a hybrid model that has a wide range of features for both still photography and video production.

== Features ==
=== Video Capabilities ===
The S1II’s partially stacked sensor improves on previous designs that had an unstacked sensor. It can record high resolution widescreen 6K and all oversamples 4K modes at 60p without a crop. It can also record 4Kp120 with a small crop. According to reviewers, when recording the full 6K 3:2 image, readout is around 12 milliseconds and improves to around 10 milliseconds at 16:9 ratios. When using the Dynamic Range Boost mode, contrast is increased, but readout drops to around 28 milliseconds with open gate recording, and 25 with 16:9 capture.

Its widescreen 2.41:1 mode compares to the CinemaScope movie aspect ratio of the 1960s.

The camera also offers many options for resolutions, frame rates, and codecs as well as the option of limiting recording modes to only your most frequently used options.

Like many LUMIX cameras, the S1II also provides Open Gate recording which allows for the capture of the full area of the sensor as well as the ability to capture a 4:3 region of the sensor for use with anamorphic lenses. It also has an added 5.1Kp60 record mode.

For audio, the camera can record 4-channel 32-bit float audio and is compatible with the DMW-XLR2 adapter.

The S1II won CineD’s award for best Mirrorless/Hybrid Camera of the Year 2025.

=== Still Photography features ===
For photography, the S1II has expanded options for the frame aspect ratio from 10 to 17, allowing users to see up to three frames at the same time. Like many Panasonic cameras, the S1II has a 96-megapixel high-resolution mode that lets you compile images in the camera without needing a computer. It also has standard Panasonic features like the Live-View Composite mode, multiple exposures, and stop-motion.

=== Autofocus ===
The S1II marks a change from previous LUMIX S1 bodies which relied on contrast-based autofocus. The S1II uses a system which combines phase detection AF with contrast-based algorithms. There are 779 selectable AF points on the frame. Subject recognition has been trained on everything from people and animals to cars and planes. With the S1II, Panasonic also debuted an “Urban Sports” detection mode meant for activities ranging from breakdancing to parkour and skateboarding. It also has eye-detection for portraits. To aid with unpredictable subjects, the camera’s pre-burst shooting can capture up to 1.5 seconds of action before the shutter is pressed.

In a firmware update from June 2025, Panasonic provided 10 AF frame colors for better visibility under any conditions.

=== Body ===
The body of the S1II has a magnesium alloy frame and is environmentally-sealed to provide dust and splash resistance. It can also operate in temperatures ranging from -10C to 40C and it includes an internal fan for cooling. Its dimensions are approximately 134x102x92mm and it weighs 800g (28.2 oz). This is smaller and lighter than the previous S1 model. Dual memory card slots include one CFexpress Type B slot and one SD (UHS II) slot.

The S1II also features a high resolution OLED electronic viewfinder with 5.76 million dots. The rear LCD is a fully articulating touchscreen designed to maintain alignment with the optical axis. A mode dial allows for quick switching between photo, video, and S&Q (Slow & Quick) modes.

=== Image Sensor ===
The S1II features a 24.1-megapixel, full-frame partially stacked BSI CMOS sensor, which enables blackout-free 70 fps bursts. It also has a carbon fiber shutter mechanism that shields the sensor when changing lenses. In June 2025, Panasonic also introduced focus stacking, allowing the synthesis of images taken at multiple focus positions.

The S1IIE features a 24.2-megapixel, full-frame BSI CMOS sensor. The camera also has a carbon fiber shutter mechanism that shields the sensor when changing lenses. The S1IIE has a Venus Engine for image processing. It has a native ISO range of 100–51,200, expandable to ISO 50–204,800.

The S1RII debuted a 44.3-megapixel back-side illuminated CMOS sensor with dual conversion gain that allows you to manually select which readout mode you prefer. The sensor is faster, but with slightly lower resolution than the S1R. The sensor’s readout time is approximately 1/27 sec in 14-bit mode and 1/50 sec in the 12-bit mode used for bursts and other quick-fire shooting modes. This sensor offers 8.1K footage (8128x4288) which conforms to the 1.89:1 aspect ratio found in DCI footage. The non-stacked sensor provides a dynamic range advantage over some contemporary competitors. The camera also improved processing from its L2 Engine. The camera also has a carbon fiber shutter mechanism that shields the sensor when changing lenses. In June 2026, Panasonic also introduced focus stacking, allowing the synthesis of images taken at multiple focus positions.

=== Lenses ===
The S1II works with Leica L-Mount lenses. Like other LUMIX S bodies, this includes a wide range of lenses from Panasonic, Sigma, Leica, and more.

=== In-body image stabilization ===
The S1II has a built-in IBIS unit with eight stops of stability. It also gives the user the ability to set the stabilization system to correct shake with anamorphic lenses. Stabilization is best in class on this camera.

=== Connectivity and smart features ===
The S1II has ports for a full-size HDMI cable as well as USB-C and a microphone and headphone jack. The USB-C port can be used to send any of the selectable recording modes to an external SSD. Media can also be moved in any direction between the SD card, CFexpress B, and external SSD right in the camera. The full-size HDMI port and connectivity allows for raw video processing with most editing software.

Panasonic also introduced data transfer via Wi-Fi and LAN via Capture One. It also has native support for Frame.io and integrates with the LUMIX Lab and LUMIX Flow apps.

Improving on previous designs, the S1II also includes timecode support for syncing multiple cameras with the Atomos UltraSync via Bluetooth.

=== Assist Tools ===
For video, features include anamorphic support like desqueeze and assist tools including Waveforms, Vectorscopes, Histogram, and False Color. Various color profiles, with ARRI LogC were added in a firmware update in June 2025.

=== Similar Cameras ===
The LUMIX S1II is the first Panasonic and second mirrorless camera to use a 24-megapixel partially stacked sensor, following the Nikon Z6III.

The S1II also shares many features with other Panasonic mirrorless cameras. It shares the same chassis design and display equipment with the S1R II. However, at only 28oz (795g), it is lighter than previous S1 bodies.

The LUMIX S1II has the same body construction as the LUMIX S1IIE and has the same 15.8Wh DMW-BLK22 battery as the LUMIX S5II, S5IIX, S9, S1RII, and S1IIE.

=== Reception ===
Reviewers at CineD highlighted the S1II’s variety of features and easy-to-use body and buttons when awarding it the best Mirrorless/Hybrid Camera of the Year 2025. While there are many 24mp full-frame cameras on the market, the S1II is notable for its speed. As a hybrid camera, it was recommended for both its photographic and video capabilities.

Some reviewers mentioned a lack of slower electronic bursts with the pre-burst option but hoped this could be addressed in future firmware updates. Others mentioned that it is only worth the cost if a user plans to utilize all of the camera’s features, but that other models are more than capable if a user only needs the basics.
