= JPG (disambiguation) =

JPG or JPEG is a method of compression for digital images.

JPG may also refer to:

- JPG (magazine), a print-on-demand magazine
- Jefferson Proving Ground, near Madison, Indiana, U.S., a munitions testing facility
- JPG by Gaultier, a fashion label of Jean-Paul Gaultier

== See also ==
- JPEG (disambiguation)
