= Journal of Photonics for Energy =

- Discipline: Photonics, optical science and power engineering
- Language: English
- Edited by: Sean Shaheen

Publication details
- History: 2011-present
- Publisher: SPIE
- Frequency: Quarterly
- Open access: Hybrid
- Impact factor: 1.7 (2022)

Standard abbreviations
- ISO 4: J. Photonics Energy

Indexing
- CODEN: JPEOBV
- ISSN: 1947-7988
- OCLC no.: 697268980

Links
- Journal homepage; Online access; Online archive

Journal of Photonics for Energy is a quarterly, online peer-reviewed scientific journal covering fundamental and applied research on the applications of photonics for renewable energy harvesting, conversion, storage, distribution, monitoring, consumption, and efficient usage, published by SPIE. The editor-in-chief is Sean Shaheen.

== Abstracting and indexing ==
The journal is abstracted and indexed in:

- Science Citation Index Expanded
- Current Contents - Physical, Chemical & Earth Sciences
- Current Contents - Engineering, Computing & Technology
- Inspec
- Scopus
- Ei/Compendex

According to the Journal Citation Reports, the journal has a 2020 impact factor of 1.836.
