= Capture One =

Photo editing software

- Developer: Capture One
- Stable release: 16.9.1 / November 18, 2026; 0 days ago
- Operating system: Windows, macOS, iOS
- Type: Image editing
- License: proprietary commercial
- Website: www.captureone.com

Capture One is a photography software suite. It includes custom support for raw image files from over 650 cameras and tethering support (remote camera control via USB, network cable or Wifi) for over 200 cameras. Originally produced by camera maker Phase One, the software department was split off into its own company, called Capture One A/S, in 2019. Both companies are majority-owned by the private equity firm Axcel. Before Axcel, Phase One including the software department was majority-owned by Silverfleet Capital.

In 2022, Capture One released its iPad app with a sub-set of features from the desktop app and Capture One Live, a cloud-based collaboration platform for getting feedback in real-time.

In 2023, Capture One was also released for iPhone.

In 2024, the Live for Studio app for iPad was released, which works together with Capture One Mac (desktop) and allows review of photos saved on desktop via local network. The app requires the Studio tier of the desktop product, but is otherwise free.

In 2026, Capture One started a collaboration with Hasselblad.

Capture One Pro is available as subscription or one-time purchase ("perpetual license") Other product variants like Studio and Enterprise are only available as subscription. The camera maker-branded variants for Phase One and Fujifilm are free for eligible owners of the respective cameras.

== Version history ==
Product name	initial version, release date	newest version, release date	Key changes, supported cameras, new features (selection)
Capture One	16.9.0, 2026-10-09	16.9.1, 2026-11-18	Barcode and QR code scanning in captures, multi-user Sessions, more AI-powered skin and hair retouching features, interface for connecting external services for retouching and generative AI, Hasselblad X2D II 100C tethering, Phase One iXM-RS250 Achromatic.
Capture One	16.8.0, 2026-05-28	16.8.6, 2026-09-16	AI-powered denoise, AI-powered photo reviewing, faster wireless tethering, Hasselblad X2D II 100C, X2D 100C, CFV 100C, Canon R6 V, Panasonic DC-L10, Phase One IXM-RS250, Canon R8 II.
Capture One	16.7.0, 2025-10-29	16.7.8, 2026-05-12	Profiles and Workspaces for negative film scanning, additional AI-supported masking and retouching, new contact sheets, Fujifilm X-T30 III, Leica M EV1, OM System OM-5 II, Canon C50, Sigma BF
Capture One	16.6.0, 2025-05-20	16.6.6, 2025-09-10	Retouch Faces, Session Builder, Library Tool updates, and improved Viewer performance on macOS, Blemish Protection, WiFi tethering for Panasonic Lumix S1 II, S1 IIE and S1R II, Fujifilm X-E5, Nikon ZR.
Capture One	16.5.0, 2024-10-23	16.5.11, 2025-05-13	More locally computed AI-driven adjustments and masking, Content Credentials, integration with Photoroom background replacement and extension service, faster export, Canon R100, Fujifilm X-M5, Nikon Z50 II, Panasonic Lumix DC-S9, Panasonic Lumix S1R II, Panasonic Lumix DC-GH7, Panasonic Lumix S1 II and S1 IIE, Leica SL3-S, Sony A1 II, Nikon P1100, Sony A7CR, Sony A7C II
Capture One	16.4.0, 2024-05-14	16.4.6, 2024-09-23	Studio SKU, AI Crop, multiple viewer windows, improvements to tethering with Fujifilm and Sony, Fujifilm GFX-100S II, Fujifilm X-T50. Sony ILX-LR1, Nikon Z6 III, Leica D-Lux 8, Canon EOS R1, Canon EOS R5 Mark II, Leica M11-D, Leica Q3 43, Sony ZV-E10 II
Capture One	16.3.0, 2023-10-25	16.3.8, 2024-04-04	AI masking, faster browsing, tethering improvements, Presentation View, Leica M11-P, Leica SL3, Lumix G9 II, Sony A7C II, Sony A7CR, Sony A9 III, Fujifilm X100 VI, OM System OM-1 Mark II
Capture One 23	16.2.0, 2023-05-16	16.2.6, 2023-11-08	New perpetual license model,Nikon Z8, iPhone 15, Fujifilm GFX 100 II, Leica Q3, Auto Dust Removal,
Capture One 23	16.0, 2022-11-08	16.1.3, 2023-04-24	Sony A7R V, Sony FX30, Canon R6 II, Canon R8, Canon R50, OM System OM-5, Smart Adjustments
Capture One 22	15.0, 2021-12-09	15.4.3, 2022-11-22	Nikon Z9, Fujifilm X-T5, Leica M11, Panasonic GH6, Wifi tethering, Panorama merge, HDR merge, AI Rotate
Capture One 21	14.0, 2020-12-08	14.4.1, 2021-10-21	Fujifilm GFX50 S II, Leica SL2, Leica SL2-S, Leica S Typ 007, Sony A1, native Apple Silicon support, Windows 11 support
Capture One 20	13.0, 2019-12-04	13.1.4, 2020-12-21	Leica SL2, Canon 1D X Mark III, Nikon Z5, Sony A7S III, before/after editing comparison
Capture One 12	12.0, 2018-11-29	12.1.5, 2019-12-19	Phase One XT, Fujifilm GFX100, parametric masks, plug-ins, Fujifilm film simulations, Enterprise features
Capture One 11	11.0, 2017-11-30	11.3.2, 2018-12-10	Phase One iXM, Phase One IQ4, Nikon Z7, Canon EOS R, tethering via network (IP)
Capture One 10	10.0, 2016-12-01	10.2.1, 2017-11-02	Cultural Heritage features, Sony A9 support
Capture One 9	9.0	9.3, 2016-09-20	Canon 5D Mark IV, Phase One IQ1 100

== Features ==
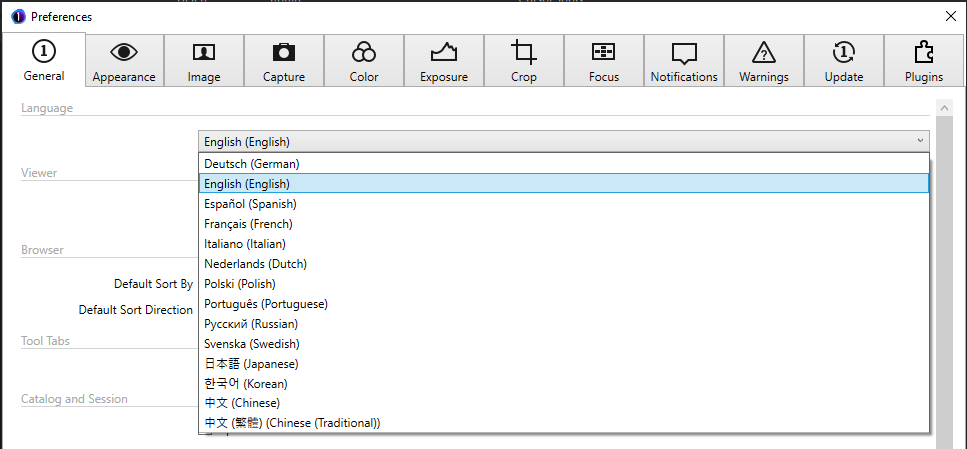
Capture One 23 language preferences

Capture One is available for macOS and Microsoft Windows. It is localized for Chinese (simplified), Chinese (traditional), English, Dutch, French, German, Italian, Japanese, Korean, Polish, Portuguese, Russian, Spanish and Swedish.

Features include smart adjustments, advanced color, styles and presets, high dynamic range, skin tone editing, before and after, film grain, healing and cloning tool, dehaze, layers, keystone correction, black and white conversion, ability to print directly from Capture One, and extension to iPad and iPhone with Capture Pilot, noise reduction, color correction, spot removal, High Dynamic Range tools, lens tools and sharpening tools.

== Run modes ==
Through different license types, different feature sets in Capture One can be configured. On January 18, 2022, the company announced discontinuation of its Fujifilm, Nikon and Sony camera brand-specific run-modes. On December 12, 2023, it announced discontinuation of the Express Run Modes. In 2026, Express for Sony licenses were reactivated following the filing of a lawsuit. For Fujifilm users, the Fujifilm RAW Converter Run Mode was introduced as a replacement for Express for Fujifilm in December 2023.

Run Mode	Feature Set
Pro	File and tethering support for all cameras
for Phase One	Same as Pro, but file and tethering support only for cameras from the respective maker.
Fujifilm RAW Converter	File support for cameras from the respective maker. No tethering. Across-the-board reduced feature set
Studio for Teams	Same as Pro, plus multiple viewer windows, more crop options, multiple compare variants, "Actions" interface for external editing and generative AI services
Studio for Enterprise	Same as Studio for Teams, plus features for e-commerce studios, e.g. barcode-reader support, extended user management, "Actions" interface for external editing and generative AI services.
Cultural Heritage	File and tethering support for Phase One cameras, plus features for reprography, like controls for motorized copy-stands.

== Timeline ==
- 2024: Introduction of Capture One Studio product.
- 2023: Capture One for iPhone is launched.
- 2022: The Capture One Live service is launched, a cloud-based option to share and review photos
- 2018: Some Capture One features are released embedded in the Phase One IQ4 digital camera back
- 2010: The Capture Pilot companion app for iOS is launched
- 2003: The independent Capture One brand was established and began supporting other camera brands
- 2002: The Phase One H20 was launched and the older "Lightphase" back was renamed as the H5 / H10 (two versions with different capabilities). At the same time the software was renamed to Capture One.
- 1998: Software launched as "Lightphase Capture", only camera supported was the 6mp Phase One Lightphase camera back.
