= JPEG (disambiguation) =

JPEG is a format for compressed digital images.

JPEG may also refer to:

- Joint Photographic Experts Group, the standardization group after which the JPEG coding format is named
- Motion JPEG, a video compression method using JPEG still image compression, sometimes referred to as "JPEG"
- JPEG File Interchange Format, a file format originally created to contain JPEG compressed images, frequently referred to as "JPEG"
- Independent JPEG Group, the group maintaining an independent implementation of ISO/IEC JPEG
- libjpeg, the implementation of JPEG as a software library
- JPEGMafia, a hiphop artist
- JPEG (album), a 2019 album by German band Digitalism
- Jessica Pegula, an American tennis player, nicknamed "JPEG"

== See also ==
- Lossless JPEG
- JPEG 2000
- Motion JPEG 2000
- JPG (disambiguation)
