= Fujifilm X-T30 =

2019 APS-C mirrorless camera

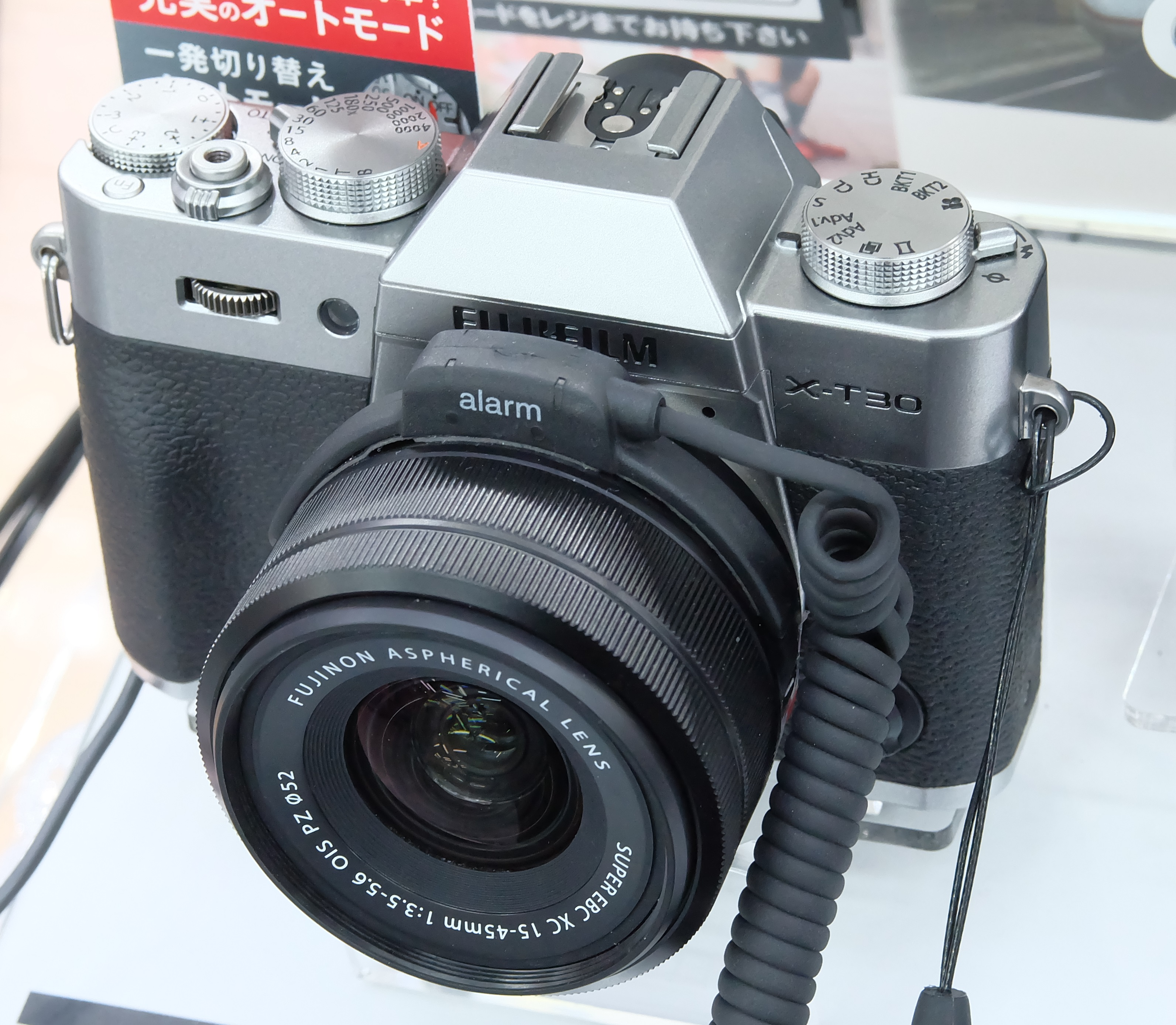
- X-T30 + XC15mm-45mm F3.5-5.6 OIS PZ

Overview
- Maker: Fujifilm
- Type: MILC
- Released: 14 February 2019; 7 years ago
- Intro price: USD 899 (body), USD 1,299 (kit)

Lens
- Lens mount: Fujifilm X
- Lens: Interchangeable lens
- Compatible lenses: Fujinon

Sensor/medium
- Sensor: APS-C
- Sensor type: X-Trans CMOS 4
- Sensor size: 23.6 mm × 15.6 mm
- Sensor maker: Sony
- Maximum resolution: 26.1 megapixels 6240 x 4160
- Film speed: 160–12800 (standard); 80–51200 (extend)
- Storage media: SD, SDHC, SDXC, UHS-I

Focusing
- Focus: Intelligent Hybrid TTL AF contrast and phase detection
- Focus modes: Single AF, Continuous AF, Manual
- Focus areas: 91 focus point
- Focus bracketing: Auto, Manual

Exposure/metering
- Exposure: TTL 256-zone metering
- Exposure bracketing: -5.0EV - +5.0EV, 1/3EV step
- Exposure modes: Program AE, Aperture Priority AE, Shutter Speed Priority AE, Manual Exposure
- Exposure metering: Through-the-lens
- Metering modes: Multi, Spot, Average, Center Weighted

Flash
- Flash: Manual pop-up flash
- Flash synchronization: 1/180 s
- Compatible flashes: Shoe Mount Flash

Shutter
- Shutter: Focal Plane Shutter
- Shutter speeds: 4 s to 1/4000 s (mechanical), 4 s to 1/32000 s (electronic)
- Continuous shooting: 30.0 fps

Viewfinder
- Viewfinder: EVF with eye sensor
- Electronic viewfinder: 0.39" 2.36M dots OLED Viewfinder
- Viewfinder magnification: 0.62
- Frame coverage: 100%

Image processing
- Image processor: X-Processor 4
- White balance: Auto, Custom, Preset, Fluorescent, Incandescent, Underwater
- WB bracketing: ±1, ±2, ±3
- Dynamic range bracketing: 100%, 200%, 400%

General
- Video recording: MOV; 4K up to 30 fps, 1080p up to 120 fps
- LCD screen: 3.0" 1.04M dots touchscreen variable-angle monitor
- Battery: NP-W126S Li-ion
- AV port(s): HDMI D, ⌀2.5 mm audio jack
- Data port: USB-C 3.1, Wi-Fi 4, Bluetooth 4.2
- Body features: Magnesium alloy body
- Dimensions: 118.4 mm × 82.8 mm × 46.8 mm (4.66 in × 3.26 in × 1.84 in)
- Weight: 383 g (14 oz) (0.844 lb) including battery and memory card
- Made in: China

Chronology
- Predecessor: Fujifilm X-T20
- Successor: Fujifilm X-T30 II

The Fujifilm X-T30 is a mirrorless interchangeable-lens camera announced by Fujifilm on February 14, 2019. The X-T30 is a successor to the X-T20, which was released in 2017. It is sold in three finishes: black, silver (as shown in the photo here) and charcoal silver.

The X-T30 was succeeded by the X-T30 II which was announced on September 2, 2021.

== Differences from the X-T20 ==
The Fujifilm X-T30 inherits a number of the key features found in the Fujifilm X-T20.

- X-Trans CMOS 4 sensor
- Increased sensor resolution to 26.1 megapixels (6240 × 4160 pixels)
- Joystick for autofocus point selection
- Hybrid autofocus system with 425 phase-detect autofocus points across the entire frame
- Increased speed of burst shooting to 20 fps when using the electronic shutter, or 30 fps in 1.25 crop mode (16.6 MP)
- High speed 100 and 120 fps video modes at 1080p for slow motion video
- Eterna film simulation mode
- Automatic focus bracketing function
- F-Log Gamma video mode at 4:2:2 10 bit via HDMI
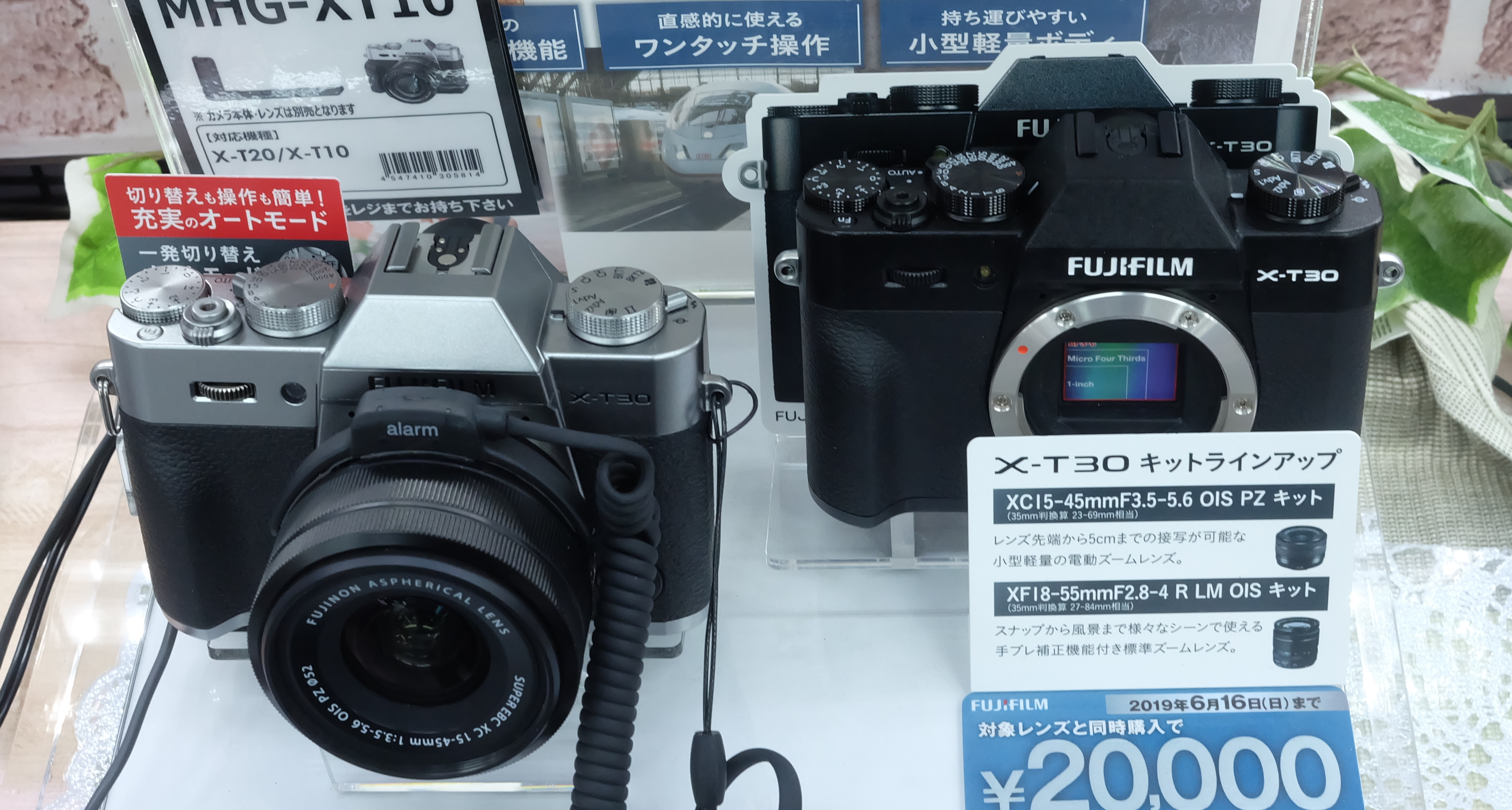

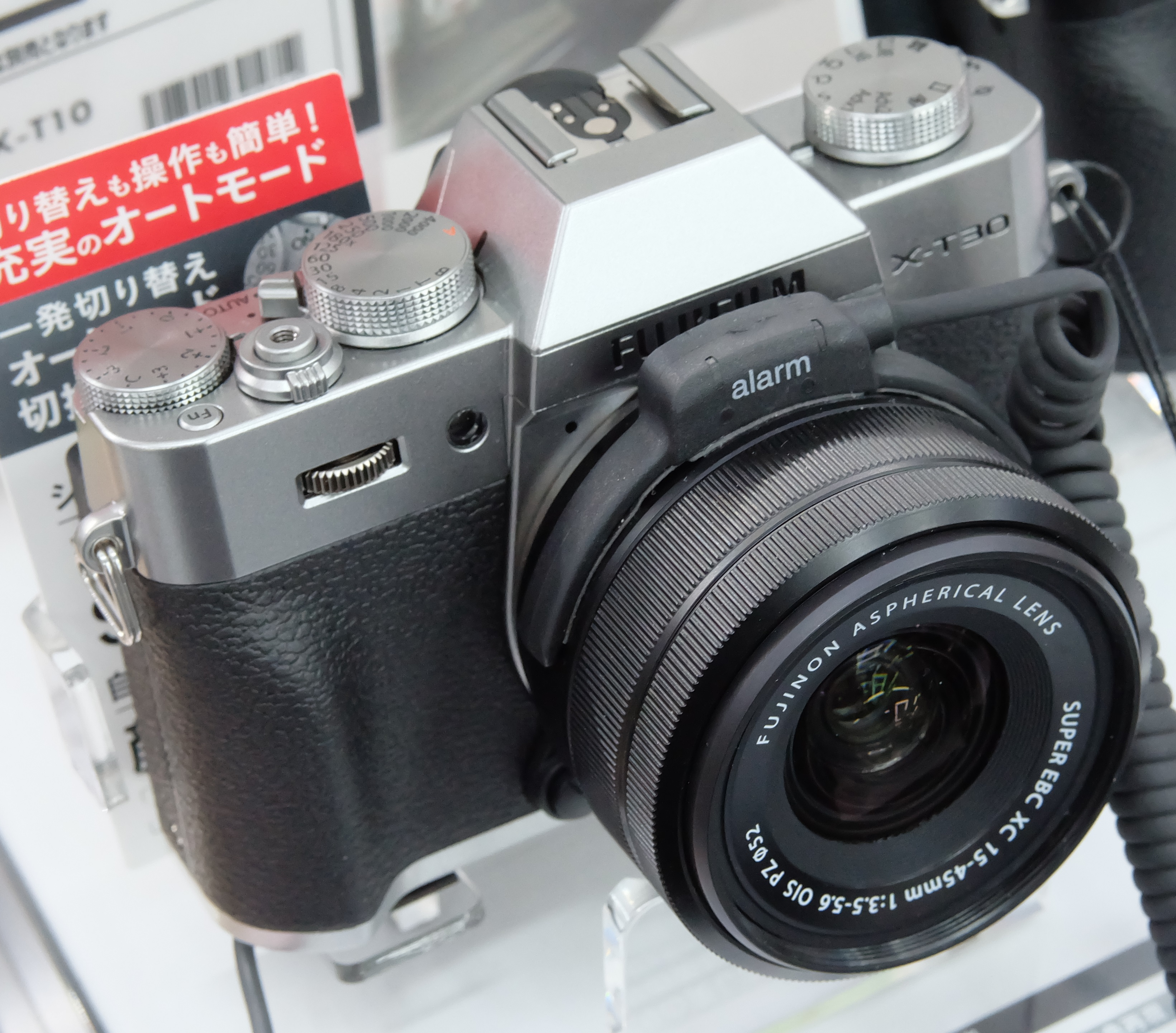

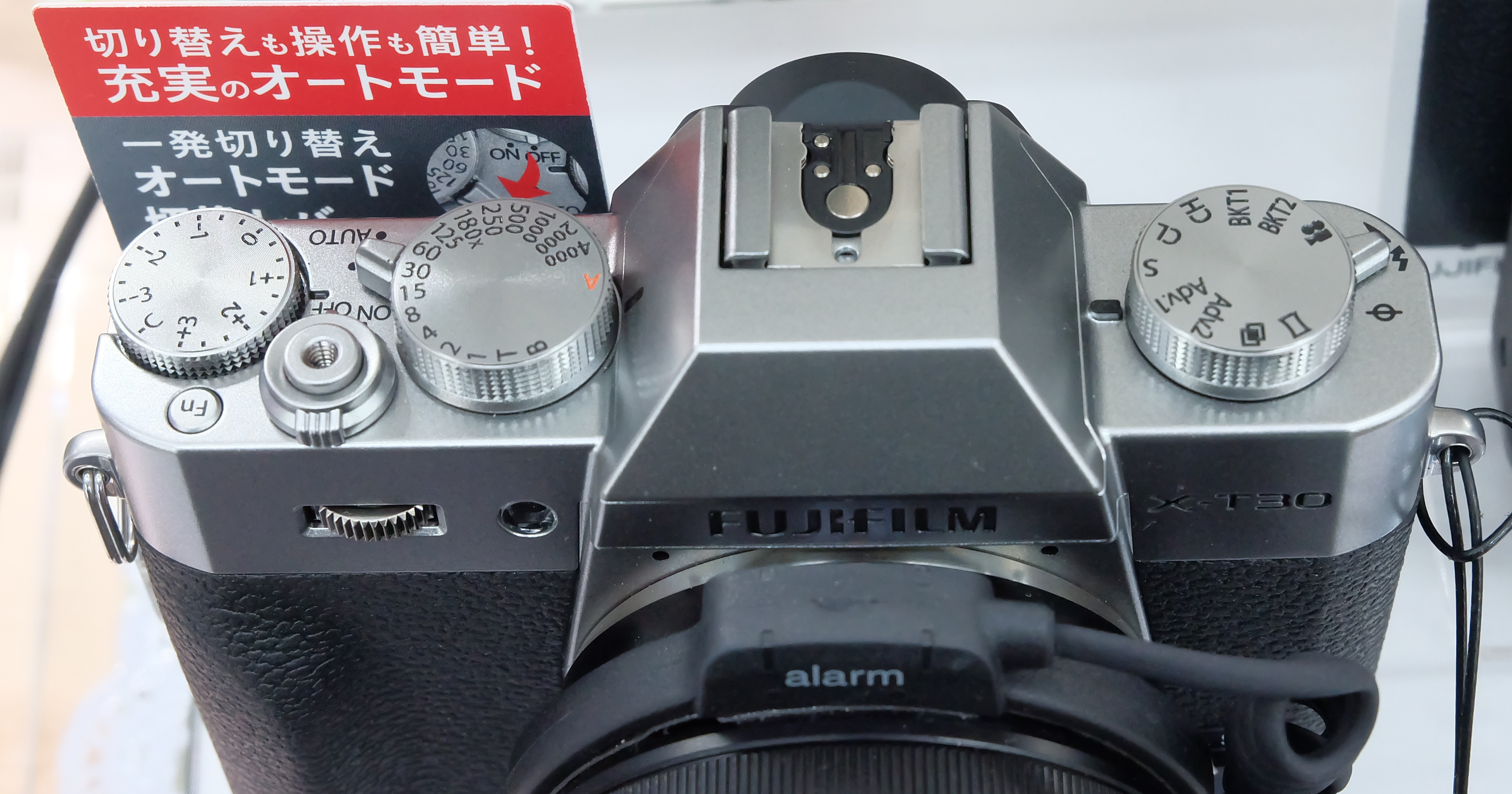

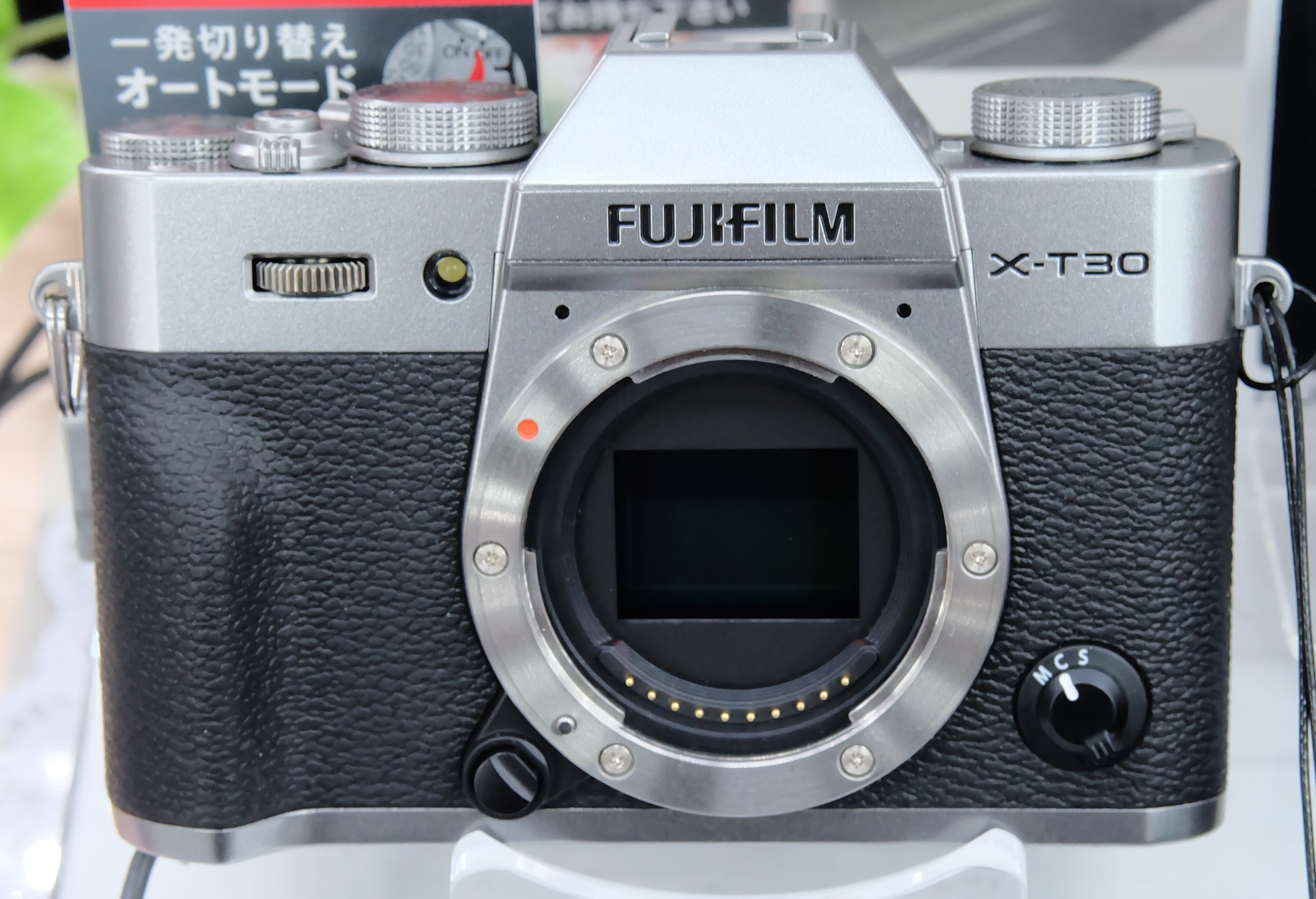

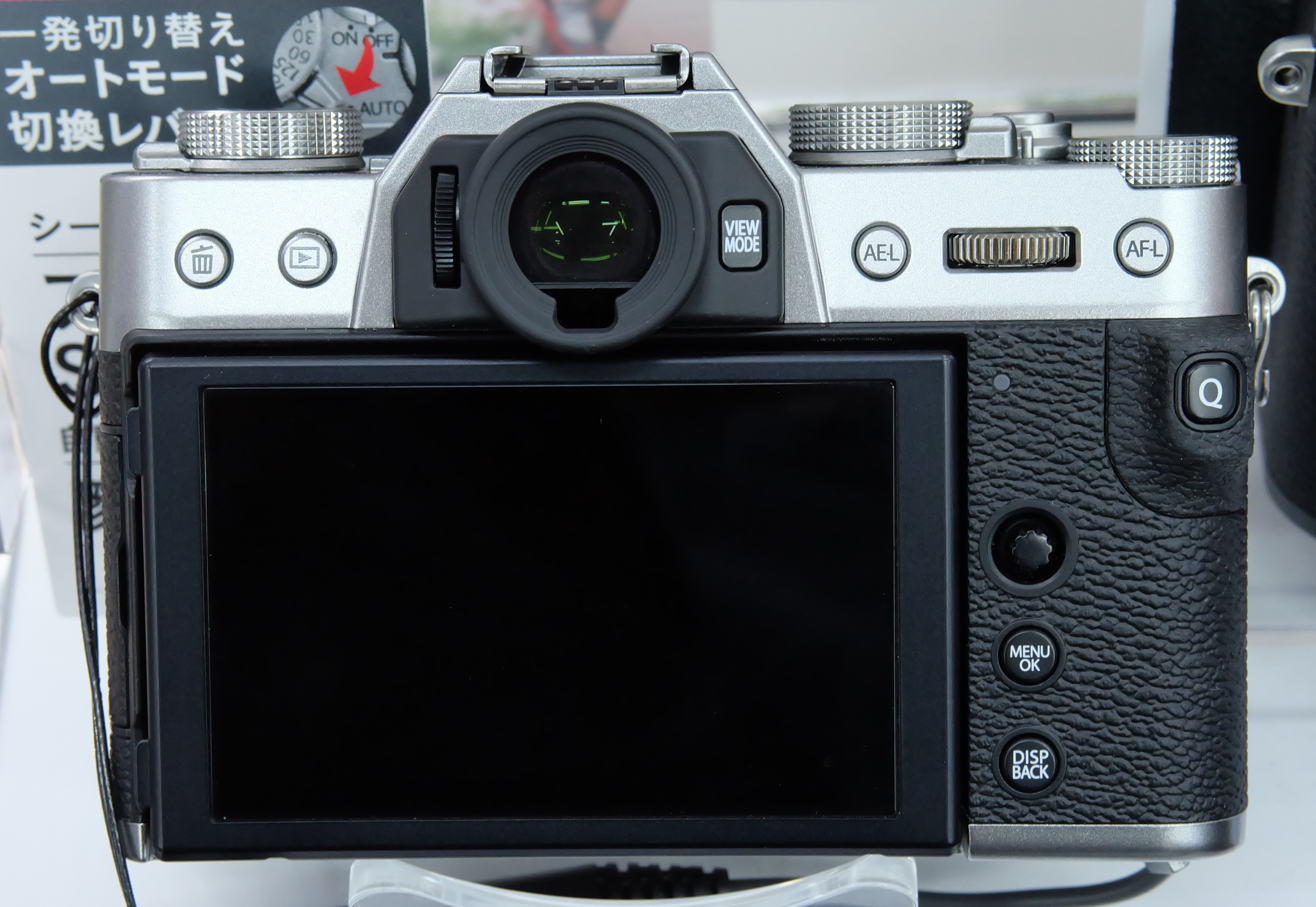

== See also ==
- List of retro-style digital cameras

Type	Lens	2011	2012	2013	2014	2015	2016	2017	2018	2019	2020	2021	2022	2023	2024	2025	2026
MILC	G-mount; Medium format sensor							GFX 50S ^{F} ^{T}					GFX 50S II ^{F} ^{T}				
MILC	G-mount; Medium format sensor									GFX 50R ^{F} ^{T}							
MILC	G-mount; Medium format sensor										GFX 100 ^{F} ^{T}					GFX 100 II ^{F} ^{T}	
MILC	G-mount; Medium format sensor											GFX 100 IR ^{F} ^{T}					
MILC	G-mount; Medium format sensor											GFX 100S ^{F} ^{T}				GFX 100S II ^{F} ^{T}	
MILC	G-mount; Medium format sensor															GFX Eterna 55 ^{F} ^{T}	
MILC	Prime lens Medium format sensor															GFX 100RF ^{F} ^{T}	
MILC	X-mount; APS-C sensor		X-Pro1				X-Pro2				X-Pro3 ^{f} ^{T}						
MILC	X-mount; APS-C sensor								X-H1 ^{F} ^{T}					X-H2 ^{A} ^{T}			
MILC	X-mount; APS-C sensor													X-H2S ^{A} ^{T}			
MILC	X-mount; APS-C sensor											X-S10 ^{A} ^{T}			X-S20 ^{A} ^{T}		
MILC	X-mount; APS-C sensor				X-T1 ^{f}			X-T2 ^{F}		X-T3 ^{F} ^{T}		X-T4 ^{A} ^{T}		X-T5 ^{F} ^{T}			
MILC	X-mount; APS-C sensor															X-T50 ^{f} ^{T}	
MILC	X-mount; APS-C sensor						X-T10 ^{f}	X-T20 ^{f} ^{T}		X-T30 ^{f} ^{T}			X-T30 II ^{f} ^{T}			X-T30 III ^{f} ^{T}	
MILC	X-mount; APS-C sensor									_{15} X-T100 ^{F} ^{T}	X-T200 ^{A} ^{T}						
MILC	X-mount; APS-C sensor			X-E1	X-E2		X-E2s		X-E3 ^{T}			X-E4 ^{f} ^{T}				X-E5 ^{f} ^{T}	
MILC	X-mount; APS-C sensor				X-M1 ^{f}											X-M5 ^{A} ^{T}	
MILC	X-mount; APS-C sensor				X-A1 ^{f}	X-A2 ^{f}		X-A3 ^{f} ^{T}	_{15} X-A5 ^{f} ^{T}		X-A7 ^{A} ^{T}						
MILC	X-mount; APS-C sensor							X-A10 ^{f}	X-A20 ^{f} ^{T}								
Compact	Prime lens APS-C sensor	X100		X100S		X100T		X100F			X100V ^{f} ^{T}				X100VI ^{f} ^{T}		
Compact	Prime lens APS-C sensor						X70 ^{f} ^{T}			XF10 ^{T}							
Compact	Prime lens 1" sensor															X half ^{T}	
Compact	Zoom lens^{2}/_{3}" sensor		X10	X20		X30 ^{f}											
Compact	Zoom lens^{2}/_{3}" sensor				XQ1	XQ2											
Compact	Zoom lens^{2}/_{3}" sensor			XF1													
Bridge	^{2}/_{3}" sensor		X-S1 ^{f}														
Type	Lens																
Type	Lens	2011	2012	2013	2014	2015	2016	2017	2018	2019	2020	2021	2022	2023	2024	2025	2026
