= Fujifilm X-T20 =

Mirrorless camera released in 2017

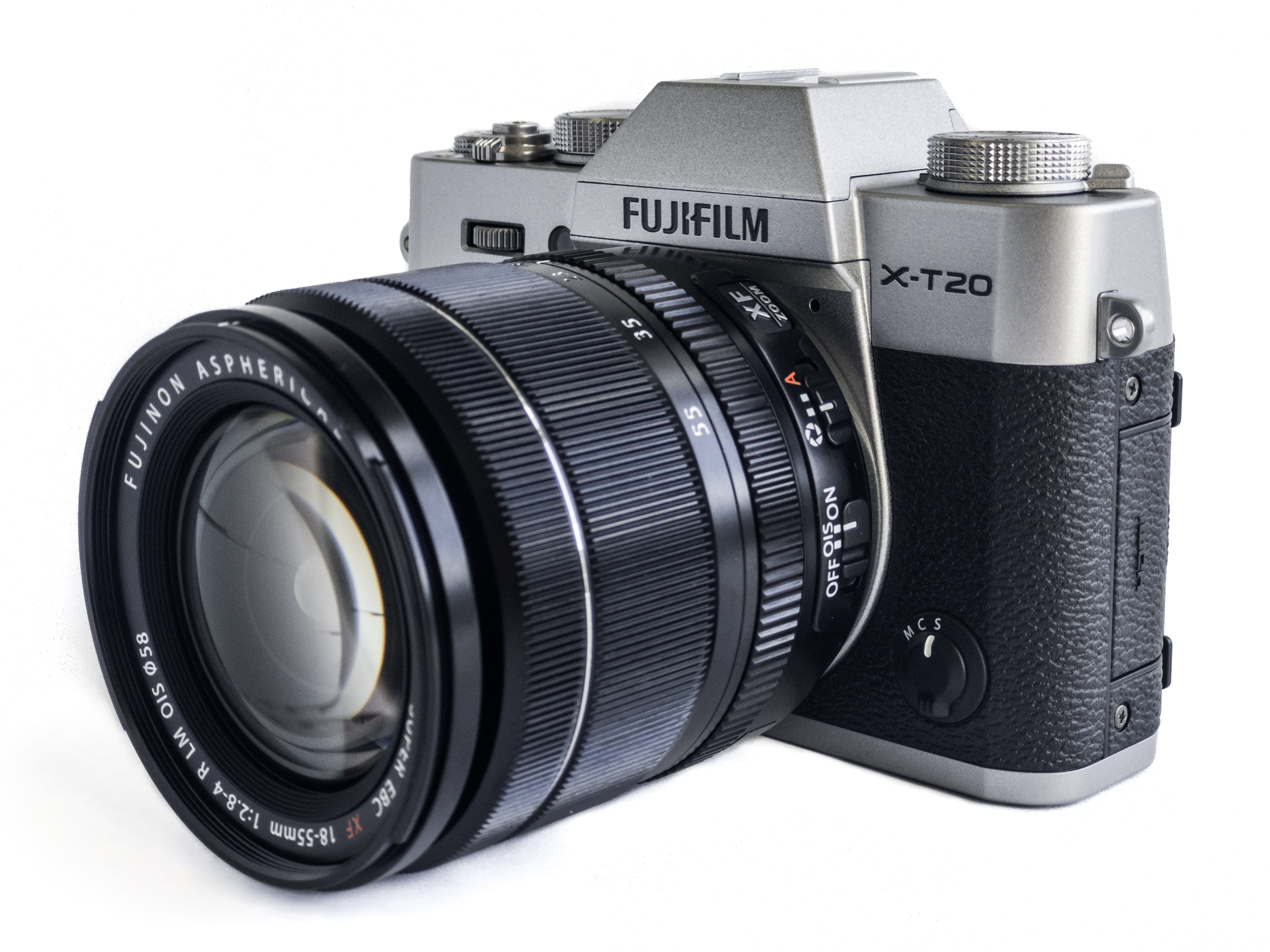
- Fujifilm X-T20

Overview
- Maker: Fujifilm
- Type: MILC
- Released: 2017 January 17
- Intro price: USD 899 (body), USD 1,199 (kit)

Lens
- Lens mount: Fujifilm X
- Lens: Interchangeable lens

Sensor/medium
- Sensor type: X-Trans CMOS III
- Sensor size: 23.6 mm × 15.6 mm (APS-C)
- Sensor maker: Sony
- Maximum resolution: 6016 x 4016 (24.3 megapixels)
- Film speed: 200–12800 (standard); 100–51200 (extend)
- Recording medium: SD, SDHC, SDXC (UHS-I)
- Storage media: SD Card (UHS-I)

Focusing
- Focus: Intelligent Hybrid TTL contrast detection / Phase detection
- Focus modes: Single point, Zone, Wide/Tracking
- Focus areas: 91 focus point

Exposure/metering
- Exposure: TTL 256-zone metering
- Exposure bracketing: AE Bracketing
- Exposure modes: Program, Aperture Priority, Shutter Speed Priority, Manual Exposure
- Metering modes: Multi, Spot, Average, Center Weighted

Flash
- Flash: Manual pop-up flash
- Compatible flashes: Shoe Mount Flash

Shutter
- Shutter: Focal Plane Shutter
- Shutter speeds: 4 s to 1/4000 s (mechanical), 1 s to 1/32000 s (electronic)
- Continuous shooting: 14 frames per second

Viewfinder
- Viewfinder: EVF with eye sensor
- Viewfinder magnification: 0.62
- Frame coverage: 100%

Image processing
- Image processor: X-Processor Pro
- White balance: Yes
- WB bracketing: Yes
- Dynamic range bracketing: Yes

General
- Video recording: 4K up to 30 fps, 1080p up to 60 fps
- LCD screen: 3.0 inches 1,040,000 dots with touchscreen
- Battery: NP-W126S Li-ion
- AV port(s): 3.5 mm, 2.5 mm audio jack, HDMI D
- Data port: USB 2.0, Wi-Fi 4
- Dimensions: 118.4 mm × 82.8 mm × 41.4 mm (4.66 in × 3.26 in × 1.63 in)
- Weight: 383 g (14 oz) (0.844 lb) including battery and memory card
- Made in: China

Chronology
- Predecessor: Fujifilm X-T10
- Successor: Fujifilm X-T30

The Fujifilm X-T20 is a mirrorless interchangeable-lens camera announced by Fujifilm on January 19, 2017. The X-T20 is a successor to the X-T10, which was released in 2015, with a number of iterative refinements and enhancements over it.

The X-T30 succeeds the X-T20. The new camera was announced on February 14, 2019. However, the X-T20 was in production until at least Q4 2019.

== Differences from the X-T10 ==
- 24.3 MGPX
- More focus points
- X-Trans CMOS III
- X-Processor Pro image processor
- Improved autofocus performance
- 4K video recording at 30 fps
- Acros film simulation
- A touchscreen with focus point selection
- Pixel mapping
- Realtime DR400 preview

== See also ==
- List of retro-style digital cameras

Type	Lens	2011	2012	2013	2014	2015	2016	2017	2018	2019	2020	2021	2022	2023	2024	2025
MILC	G-mount; Medium format sensor							GFX 50S ^{F} ^{T}					GFX 50S II ^{F} ^{T}			
MILC	G-mount; Medium format sensor									GFX 50R ^{F} ^{T}						
MILC	G-mount; Medium format sensor										GFX 100 ^{F} ^{T}					GFX 100 II ^{F} ^{T}
MILC	G-mount; Medium format sensor											GFX 100 IR ^{F} ^{T}				
MILC	G-mount; Medium format sensor											GFX 100S ^{F} ^{T}				GFX 100S II^{F} ^{T}
MILC	G-mount; Medium format sensor															GFX Eterna 55^{F} ^{T}
MILC	Prime lens Medium format sensor															GFX 100RF ^{F} ^{T}
MILC	X-mount; APS-C sensor		X-Pro1				X-Pro2				X-Pro3 ^{f} ^{T}					
MILC	X-mount; APS-C sensor								X-H1 ^{F} ^{T}					X-H2 ^{A} ^{T}		
MILC	X-mount; APS-C sensor													X-H2S ^{A} ^{T}		
MILC	X-mount; APS-C sensor											X-S10 ^{A} ^{T}			X-S20 ^{A} ^{T}	
MILC	X-mount; APS-C sensor				X-T1 ^{f}			X-T2 ^{F}		X-T3 ^{F} ^{T}		X-T4 ^{A} ^{T}		X-T5 ^{F} ^{T}		
MILC	X-mount; APS-C sensor						X-T10 ^{f}	X-T20 ^{f} ^{T}		X-T30 ^{f} ^{T}			X-T30 II ^{f} ^{T}			X-T50 ^{f} ^{T}
MILC	X-mount; APS-C sensor									_{15} X-T100 ^{F} ^{T}	X-T200 ^{A} ^{T}					X-T30 III ^{f} ^{T}
MILC	X-mount; APS-C sensor			X-E1	X-E2		X-E2s		X-E3 ^{T}			X-E4 ^{f} ^{T}				X-E5 ^{f} ^{T}
MILC	X-mount; APS-C sensor				X-M1 ^{f}											X-M5 ^{A} ^{T}
MILC	X-mount; APS-C sensor				X-A1 ^{f}	X-A2 ^{f}		X-A3 ^{f} ^{T}	_{15} X-A5 ^{f} ^{T}		X-A7 ^{A} ^{T}					
MILC	X-mount; APS-C sensor							X-A10 ^{f}	X-A20 ^{f} ^{T}							
Compact	Prime lens APS-C sensor	X100		X100S		X100T		X100F			X100V ^{f} ^{T}				X100VI ^{f} ^{T}	
Compact	Prime lens APS-C sensor						X70 ^{f} ^{T}			XF10 ^{T}						
Compact	Prime lens 1" sensor															X half ^{T}
Compact	Zoom lens^{2}/_{3}" sensor		X10	X20		X30 ^{f}										
Compact	Zoom lens^{2}/_{3}" sensor				XQ1	XQ2										
Compact	Zoom lens^{2}/_{3}" sensor			XF1												
Bridge	^{2}/_{3}" sensor		X-S1 ^{f}													
Type	Lens															
Type	Lens	2011	2012	2013	2014	2015	2016	2017	2018	2019	2020	2021	2022	2023	2024	2025
