= Fujifilm X-T10 =

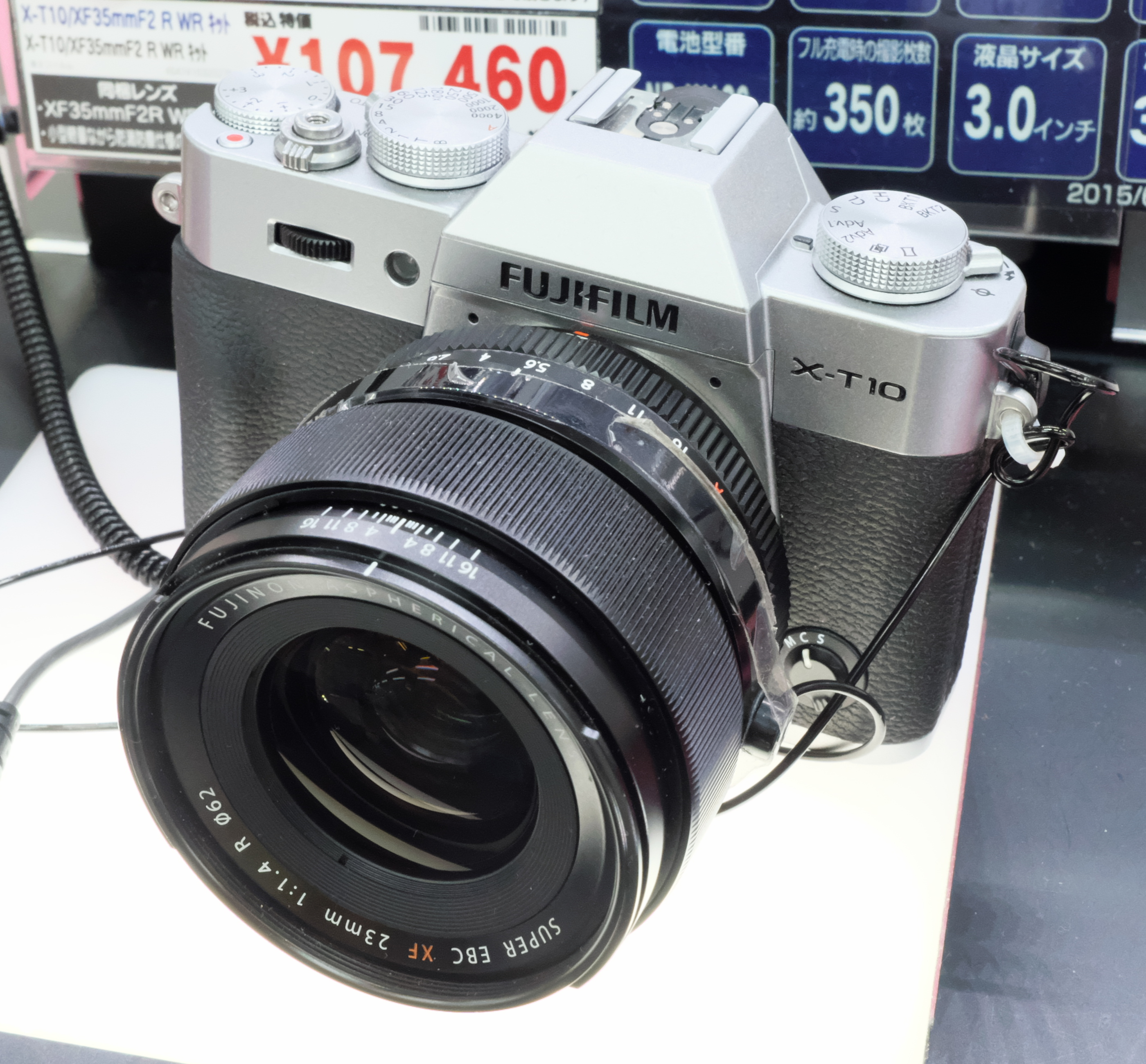
- Silver Fujifilm X-T10 + XF23mm F1.4 R

Overview
- Maker: Fujifilm
- Type: MILC
- Released: 18 May 2015
- Intro price: USD 799 (body), USD 1,099 (kit)

Lens
- Lens mount: Fujifilm X
- Lens: Interchangeable lens

Sensor/medium
- Sensor type: X-Trans CMOS II
- Sensor size: 23.6 mm × 15.6 mm (APS-C)
- Sensor maker: Sony
- Maximum resolution: 4896 x 3264 (16 megapixels)
- Film speed: 200–6400 (standard); 100–51200 (extend)
- Recording medium: SD, SDHC, SDXC (UHS-I)
- Storage media: SD Card (UHS-I)

Focusing
- Focus: Intelligent Hybrid TTL contrast detection / Phase detection
- Focus modes: Single point, Zone, Wide/Tracking
- Focus areas: 49 focus point

Exposure/metering
- Exposure: TTL 256-zone metering
- Exposure bracketing: AE Bracketing
- Exposure modes: Program, Aperture Priority, Shutter Speed Priority, Manual Exposure
- Metering modes: Multi, Spot, Average

Flash
- Compatible flashes: EF-X8 external shoe-mount flash included

Shutter
- Shutter: Focal Plane Shutter
- Shutter speeds: 4 s to 1/4000 s (mechanical), 1 s to 1/32000 s (electronic)
- Continuous shooting: 8 frames per second

Viewfinder
- Viewfinder: EVF with eye sensor
- Viewfinder magnification: 0.62
- Frame coverage: 100%

Image processing
- Image processor: EXR Processor II
- White balance: Yes
- WB bracketing: Yes
- Dynamic range bracketing: Yes

General
- Video recording: 1080p up to 60 fps, 720p up to 60 fps
- LCD screen: 3.0 inches 920,000 dots tiltscreen
- Battery: NP-W126 Li-ion
- AV port(s): 2.5 mm audio jack, HDMI D
- Data port(s): USB 2.0, Wi-Fi 4
- Dimensions: 118.4 mm × 82.8 mm × 40.8 mm (4.66 in × 3.26 in × 1.61 in)
- Weight: 381 g (13 oz) (0.840 lb) including battery and memory card
- Made in: Thailand

Chronology
- Successor: Fujifilm X-T20

The Fujifilm X-T10 is a digital interchangeable-lens camera announced by Fujifilm on May 18, 2015. It is a smaller, lighter and lower priced alternative to the Fujifilm X-T1, Fujifilm's flagship camera. The camera was made available in an all black colour scheme, in addition to a silver and black colour scheme.

As with many other Fujifilm X series cameras, the physical design takes heavily from SLR cameras, including a fake pentaprism and large control dials on the top of the camera. Hidden inside the fake pentaprism hump is a built in flash, something the X-T1 lacked.

The camera was praised by reviewers for its small size, physical appearance, colour rendering, controls, noise performance, and its price. It was criticized for being only 16 megapixels, poor video quality, not being weather sealed, and poor subject tracking.

The X-T10 lacks the X-T1's weather sealing, has a smaller viewfinder and lower resolution LCD but adds built-in flash and a threaded cable shutter release socket.

In January 2017, Fujifilm announced the X-T20 as the successor to the X-T10.

== Compared to the X-T1 ==
Much of X-T10's internals are lifted directly from the X-T1, with most of their differences being external. An exception is the camera's buffer, which is much smaller on the X-T10, limiting max speed shooting to around a second before the camera needs to pause to empty its buffer and write the images to storage.

When released, the X-T10 did have a more advanced autofocus algorithm as well, although this was later brought to the X-T1 through an update.

The biggest difference between the two cameras is that the X-T10 is noticeably smaller and lighter compared to the X-T1, in addition to being less expensive at launch.

Some of the physical aspects of the X-T1 that were very well received, like its large viewfinder and weather sealing, have been omitted on the X-T10. The X-T10 also has added a lever to go to full auto, a built in flash, and changed the dial left of the pentaprism to set the drive mode, instead of ISO.

Some of the minor differences between the two cameras include the dual command dials being clickable, acting as customisable function buttons, a slightly lower resolution back screen, and not having a battery grip.

== Updates ==
As with other Fujifilm X cameras, the X-T10 has received various updates to the camera firmware, primarily adding and adjusting functionality of X-mount lenses, and lacking the kind of Kaizen updates seen in the X-T1, and other Fuji X cameras.

== Reception ==
The X-T10 was largely well received by reviewers, with a small number even rating it higher than the X-T1, primarily citing the smaller price.

It was praised for its size, price, and being fun to use. Reviewers also said they enjoyed the colour rendering, autofocus, its good ISO noise performance, and how the camera looks and feels to use.

Reviewers criticized its aliasing in video, and said that its subject tracking autofocus performed poorly compared to competitors like the Sony α6000. Reviewers also pointed out that for its price, there were other cameras available that performed better, in particular for video and autofocus. Some also criticized it for being less ergonomic than the X-T1, and lacking the X-T1's weather sealing.

Reviewers noted that the X-T10 trades a fun shooting experience for specs, as well, with DPReview saying "whether or not you buy this camera over its competitors will boil down to what you value more in an APS-C camera, the one with the best overall specs and capabilities, or the one with the potential to offers (sic) the more enjoyable shooting experience."

The Verge scored the camera 8.8, praising the camera's autofocus, price, shooting experience, colour and noise performance, and image quality, putting particular emphasis on the shooting experience. They criticized the camera's video, saying "It’s clear that Fujifilm is building its cameras for still photography first and video capability second", and added that for some people, lack of weather sealing might be a deal breaker.

TechRadar gave the X-T10 4.5/5 stars, and said they enjoyed autofocus, the build quality, and the increased accessibility to novice photographers while still being good for enthusiasts. They didn't like that the tilt screen only tilts on one axis, and that ISO expansion values were limited to JPEG output.

PetaPixel enjoyed how the controls feel and praised the X-T10's noise performance across its ISO range, and also said that they were very pleased with the autofocus performance. They didn't find the grip comfortable, and criticized the lack of a ISO dial.

DPReview gave the X-T10 an 80% silver award, praising the shooting experience, colours, and image quality. They also appreciated the camera's noise performance and in camera raw processor, and they criticized the camera's video quality and subject tracking in continuous autofocus.

== Some photos taken with a Fuji X-T10 ==
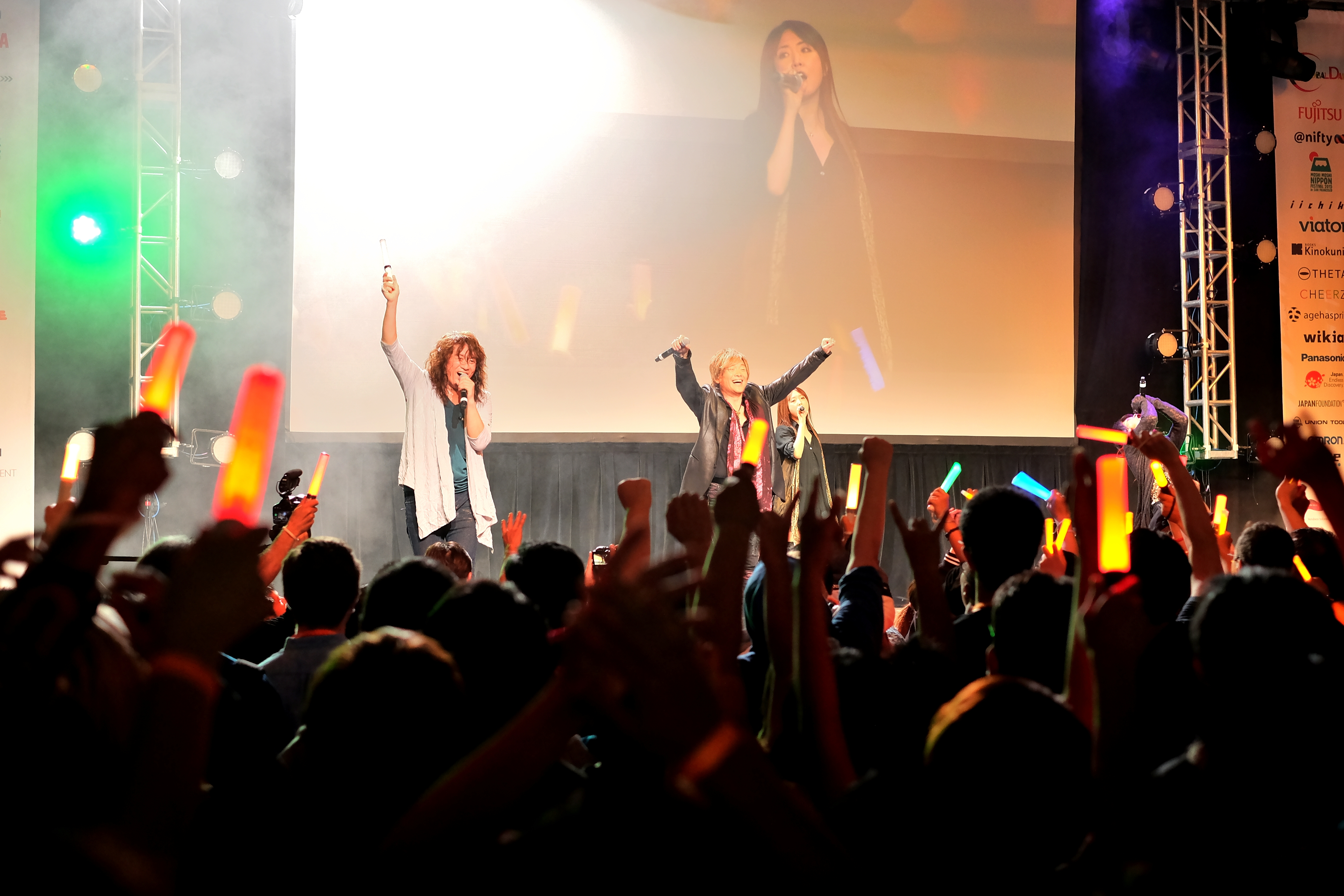
Music live by JAM project at J-POP SUMMIT 2015

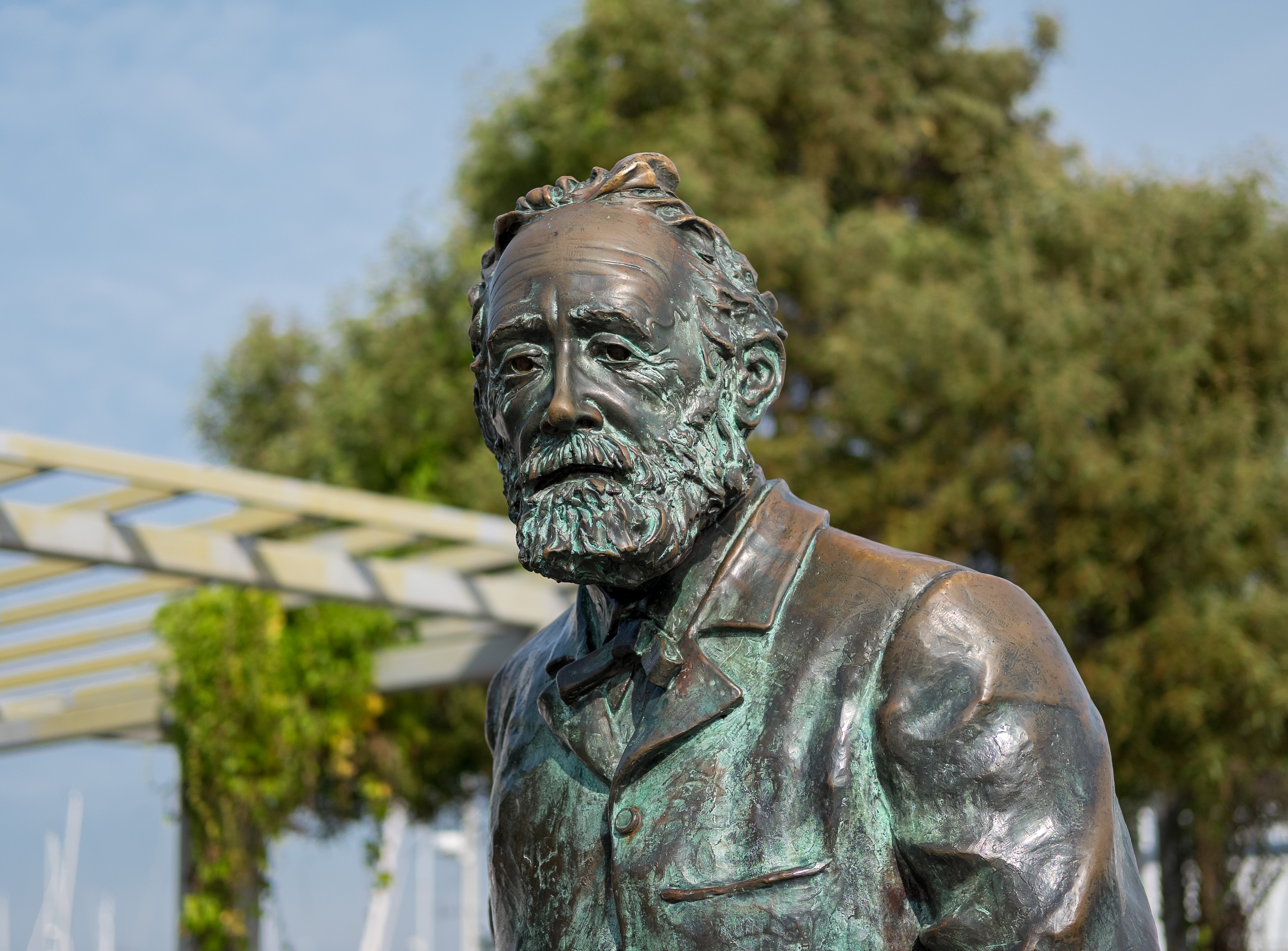
Depth of field between statue and background

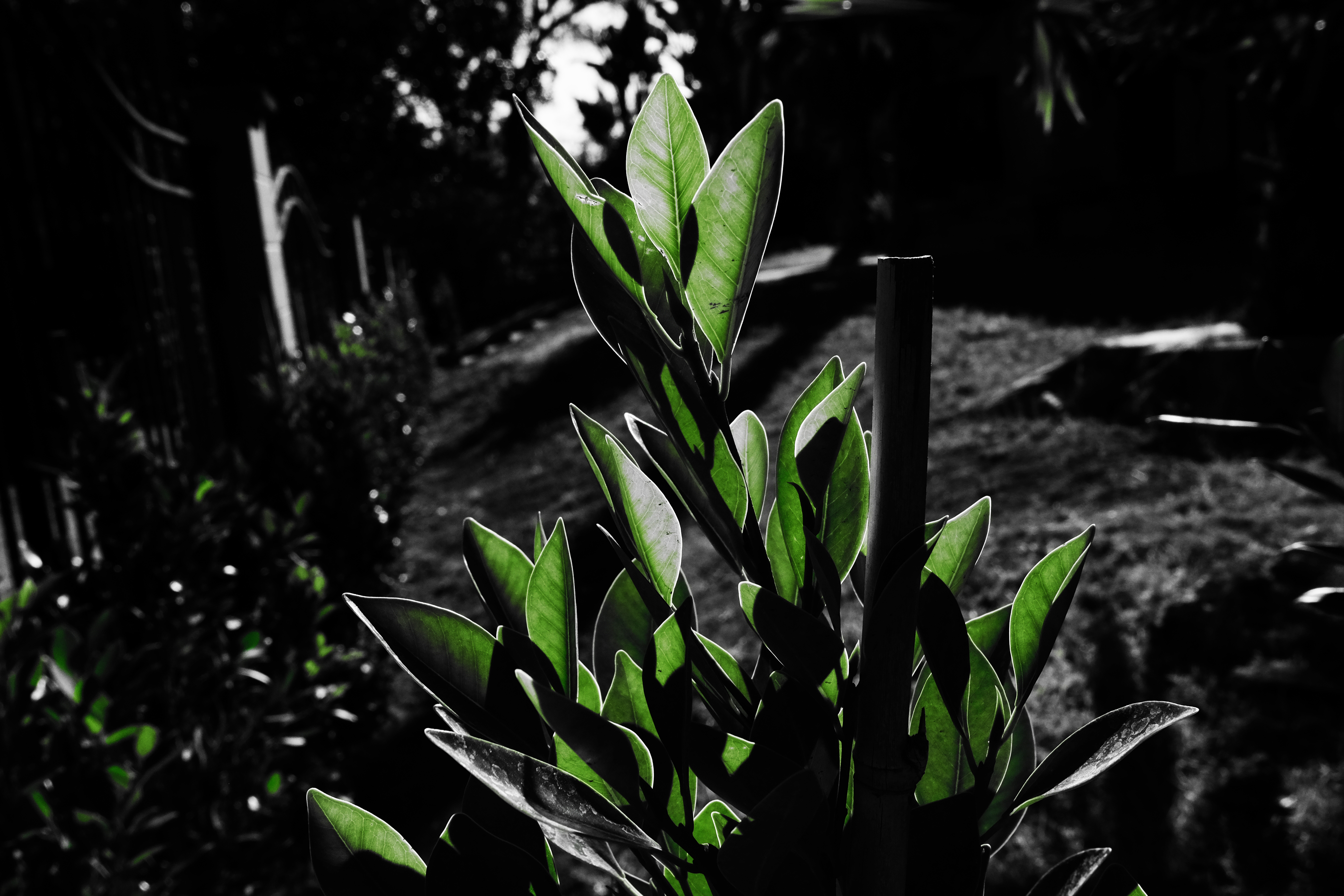
In-camera green filter

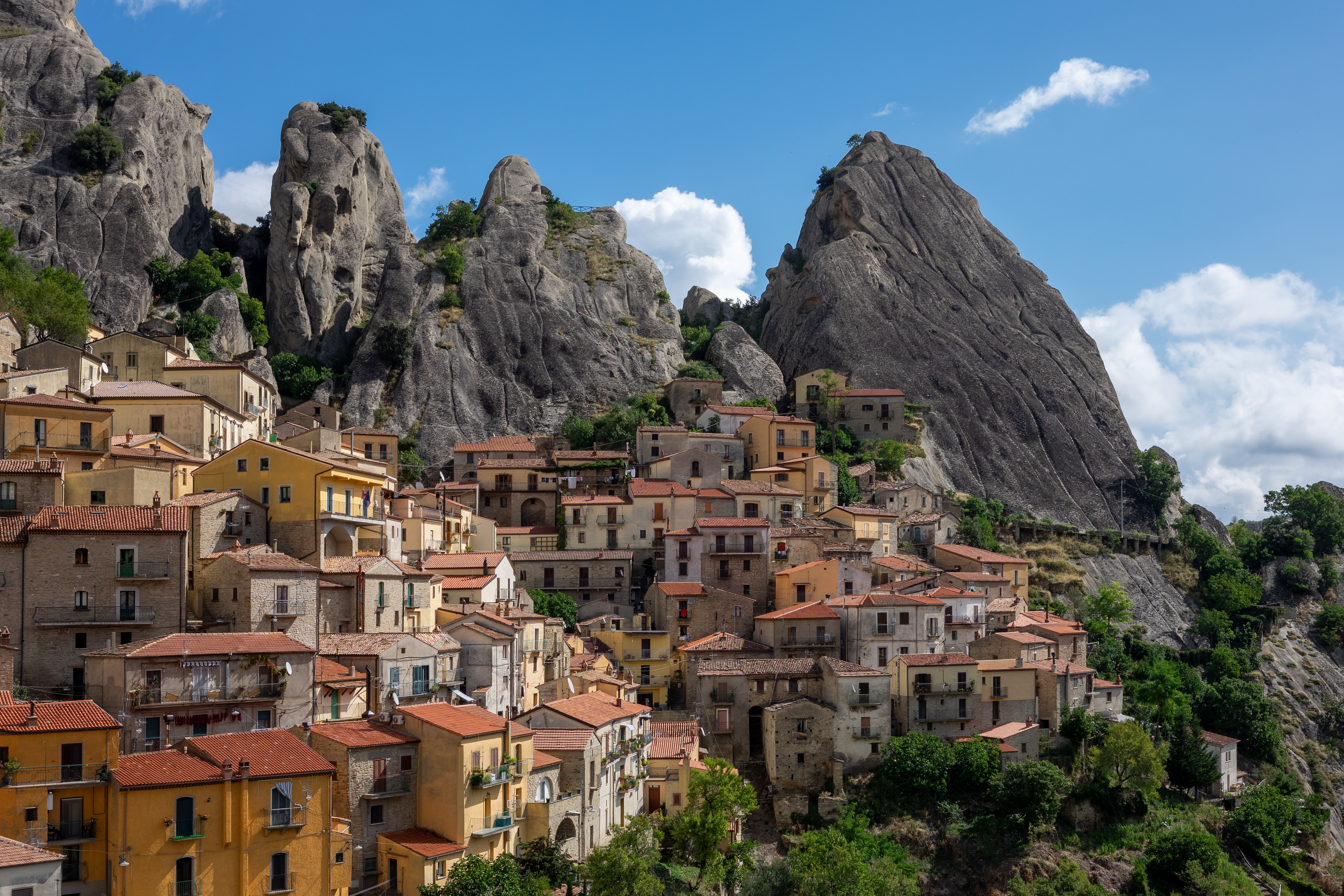
Landscape at Castelmezzano, Italy

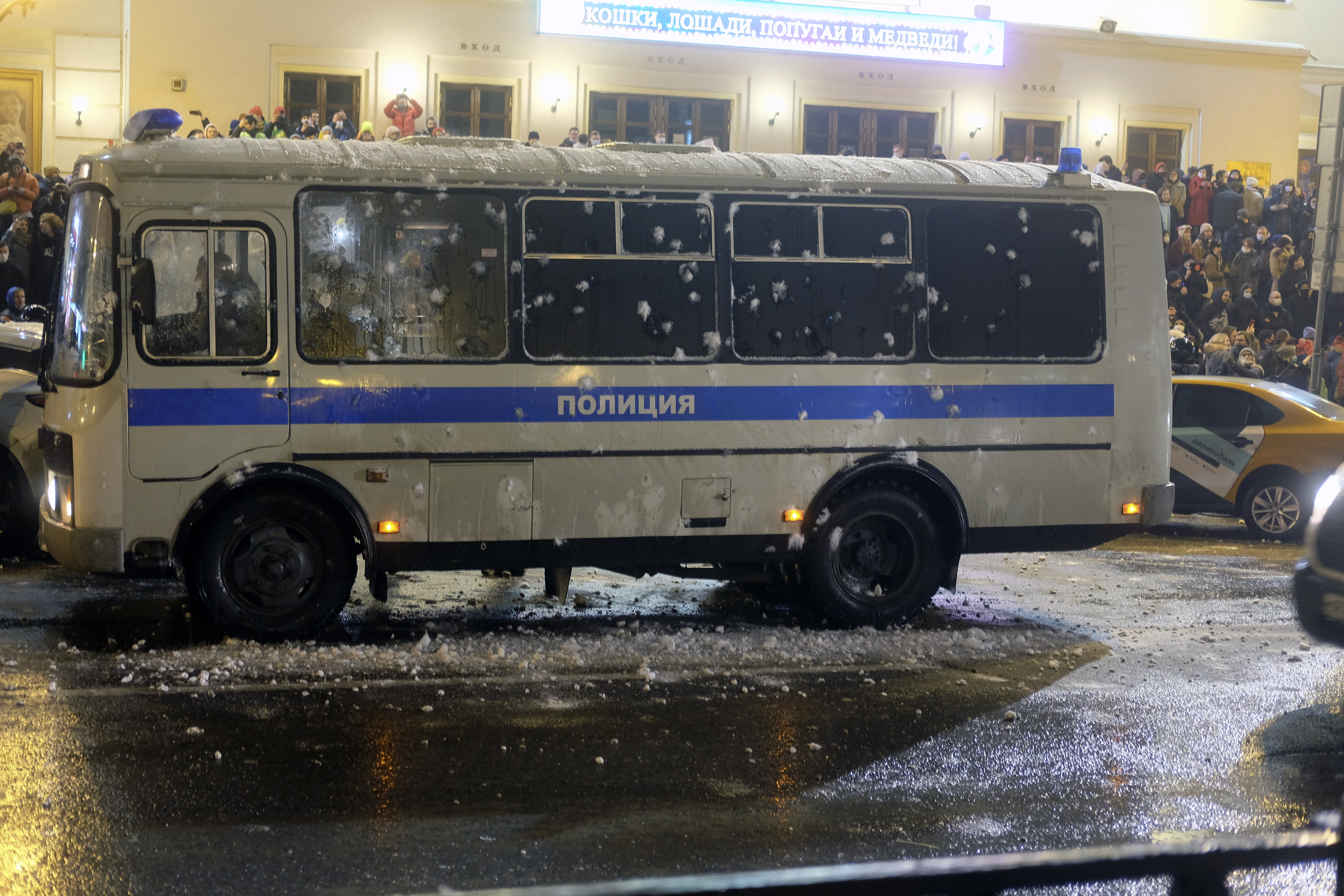
Night scene with 35mm f2 1/38s

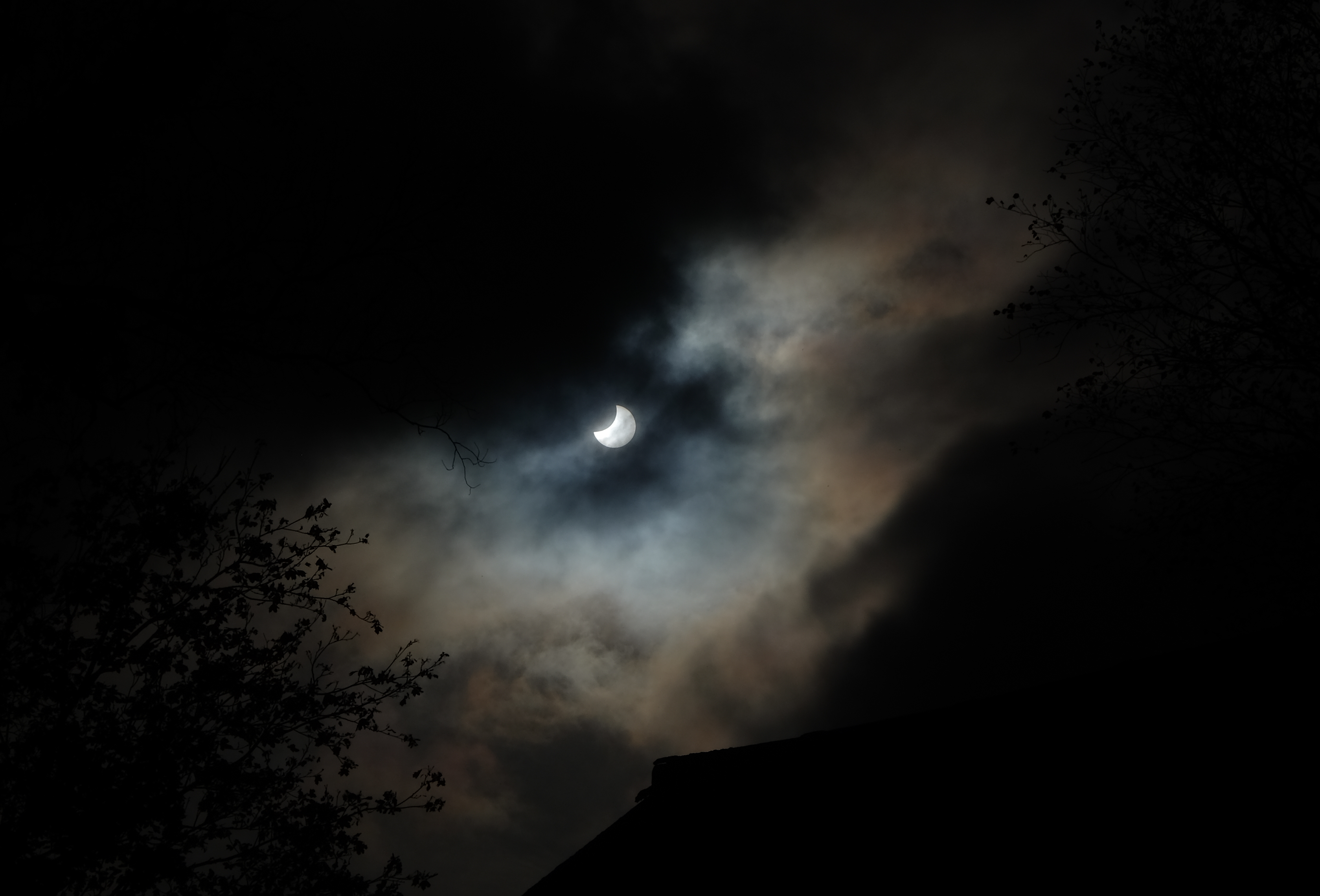
Solar eclipse, X-T10 with Fujinon XF 18-55 mm F2.8-4

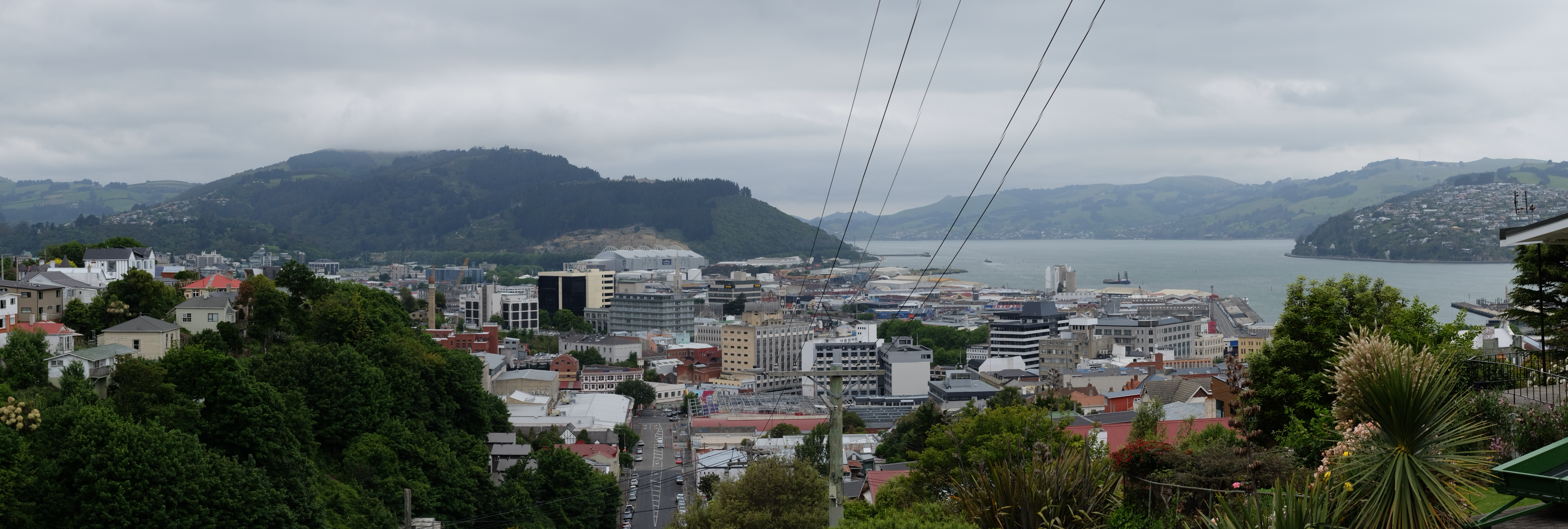
In-camera panorama mode

== Features ==
- 16.3 MP APS-C X-Trans CMOS II Sensor
- EXR Processor II
- 0.39" 2,360k-Dot 0.62x OLED Viewfinder
- 3.0" 920k-Dot Tilting LCD Monitor
- Full HD 1080p Video Recording at 60 fps
- Built-in Wi-Fi Connectivity
- Intelligent Hybrid AF with 77 Areas
- Up to 8 fps Shooting and ISO 51200
- Film Simulation Mode
- EF-X8 external shoe-mount flash included

== See also ==
- List of retro-style digital cameras

Type	Lens	2011	2012	2013	2014	2015	2016	2017	2018	2019	2020	2021	2022	2023	2024	2025
MILC	G-mount; Medium format sensor							GFX 50S ^{F} ^{T}					GFX 50S II ^{F} ^{T}			
MILC	G-mount; Medium format sensor									GFX 50R ^{F} ^{T}						
MILC	G-mount; Medium format sensor										GFX 100 ^{F} ^{T}					GFX 100 II ^{F} ^{T}
MILC	G-mount; Medium format sensor											GFX 100 IR ^{F} ^{T}				
MILC	G-mount; Medium format sensor											GFX 100S ^{F} ^{T}				GFX 100S II^{F} ^{T}
MILC	G-mount; Medium format sensor															GFX Eterna 55^{F} ^{T}
MILC	Prime lens Medium format sensor															GFX 100RF ^{F} ^{T}
MILC	X-mount; APS-C sensor		X-Pro1				X-Pro2				X-Pro3 ^{f} ^{T}					
MILC	X-mount; APS-C sensor								X-H1 ^{F} ^{T}					X-H2 ^{A} ^{T}		
MILC	X-mount; APS-C sensor													X-H2S ^{A} ^{T}		
MILC	X-mount; APS-C sensor											X-S10 ^{A} ^{T}			X-S20 ^{A} ^{T}	
MILC	X-mount; APS-C sensor				X-T1 ^{f}			X-T2 ^{F}		X-T3 ^{F} ^{T}		X-T4 ^{A} ^{T}		X-T5 ^{F} ^{T}		
MILC	X-mount; APS-C sensor						X-T10 ^{f}	X-T20 ^{f} ^{T}		X-T30 ^{f} ^{T}			X-T30 II ^{f} ^{T}			X-T50 ^{f} ^{T}
MILC	X-mount; APS-C sensor									_{15} X-T100 ^{F} ^{T}	X-T200 ^{A} ^{T}					
MILC	X-mount; APS-C sensor			X-E1	X-E2		X-E2s		X-E3 ^{T}			X-E4 ^{f} ^{T}				X-E5 ^{f} ^{T}
MILC	X-mount; APS-C sensor				X-M1 ^{f}											X-M5 ^{A} ^{T}
MILC	X-mount; APS-C sensor				X-A1 ^{f}	X-A2 ^{f}		X-A3 ^{f} ^{T}	_{15} X-A5 ^{f} ^{T}		X-A7 ^{A} ^{T}					
MILC	X-mount; APS-C sensor							X-A10 ^{f}	X-A20 ^{f} ^{T}							
Compact	Prime lens APS-C sensor	X100		X100S		X100T		X100F			X100V ^{f} ^{T}				X100VI ^{f} ^{T}	
Compact	Prime lens APS-C sensor						X70 ^{f} ^{T}			XF10 ^{T}						
Compact	Prime lens 1" sensor															X half ^{T}
Compact	Zoom lens^{2}/_{3}" sensor		X10	X20		X30 ^{f}										
Compact	Zoom lens^{2}/_{3}" sensor				XQ1	XQ2										
Compact	Zoom lens^{2}/_{3}" sensor			XF1												
Bridge	^{2}/_{3}" sensor		X-S1 ^{f}													
Type	Lens															
Type	Lens	2011	2012	2013	2014	2015	2016	2017	2018	2019	2020	2021	2022	2023	2024	2025
