= List of Micro Four Thirds cameras =

The Micro Four Thirds system (MFT) of still and video cameras and lenses was released by Olympus and Panasonic in 2008; lenses built for MFT use a flange focal distance of 19.25 mm, covering an image sensor with dimensions 17.3 × 13.0 mm (21.6 mm diagonal). MFT cameras which accept MFT lenses have been produced by many companies under several different brands, including Blackmagic Design, DJI, JVC, Kodak, Olympus, Panasonic, Sharp, and Xiaomi.

== Cameras ==
=== Still with video ===
These devices are shaped like traditional still cameras, either single lens reflex or rangefinder camera, and have extensive features for still image capture; however, nearly all also are capable of recording videos, with varying degrees of emphasis on video capture.

Major features of Micro Four Thirds system camera bodies
Item	Model	Image	Image sensor				Dimensions		Electronic View Finder (EVF)			Announced
Item	Model	Image	Aspect ratio(s)	Res. (gross)	Res. (effect.)	Video	W×H×D	Wgt.	Built-in	Mag.	Res. (Mdots)	Announced
1	Panasonic Lumix DMC-G1		4:3	13.1 MP	12.1 MP (4000×3000)	No	124×84×45 mm (4.9×3.3×1.8 in)	385 g (13.6 oz)	Yes	1.4×	1.44	Sep 12, 2008
2	Panasonic Lumix DMC-GH1		4:3; 3:2; 16:9 (multi-aspect)	14.0 MP	12.1 MP (4000×3000; 4128×2752; 4352×2448)	1080p30 AVCHD	124×90×45 mm (4.9×3.5×1.8 in)	385 g (13.6 oz)	Yes	1.4×	1.44	Mar 3, 2009
3	Olympus PEN E-P1		4:3	13.1 MP	12.3 MP (4032×3024)	720p30 MJPEG	121×70×36 mm (4.8×2.8×1.4 in)	355 g (12.5 oz)	No	—N/a		Jun 16, 2009
4	Panasonic Lumix DMC-GF1		4:3	13.1 MP	12.1 MP (4000×3000)	720p30 AVCHD Lite	119×71×36 mm (4.7×2.8×1.4 in)	385 g (13.6 oz)	LVF1 (opt.)	1.04×	0.202	Sep 2, 2009
5	Olympus PEN E-P2		4:3	13.1 MP	12.3 MP (4032×3024)	720p30 MJPEG	121×70×36 mm (4.8×2.8×1.4 in)	355 g (12.5 oz)	VF-2 (opt.) (Note: This camera is equipped with the AP-1 accessory port, which also is compatible with the VF-3 EVF: 1.0× magnification, 0.920 M dots; the VF-4 EVF also is compatible, but has degraded resolution.)	1.15×	1.44	Nov 5, 2009
6	Olympus PEN E-PL1		4:3	13.1 MP	12.3 MP (4032×3024)	720p30 MJPEG	115×72×42 mm (4.5×2.8×1.7 in)	334 g (11.8 oz)	VF-2 (opt.)	1.15×	1.44	Feb 3, 2010
7	Panasonic Lumix DMC-G10		4:3	13.1 MP	12.1 MP (4000×3000)	720p30 MJPEG	124×90×74 mm (4.9×3.5×2.9 in)	388 g (13.7 oz)	Yes	1.04×	0.202	Mar 7, 2010
8	Panasonic Lumix DMC-G2		4:3	13.1 MP	12.1 MP (4000×3000)	720p30 AVCHD Lite	124×84×74 mm (4.9×3.3×2.9 in)	428 g (15.1 oz)	Yes	1.4×	1.44	Mar 7, 2010
9	Panasonic Lumix DMC-GH2		4:3; 3:2; 16:9 (multi-aspect)	18.3 MP	16.0 MP (4608×3456; 4752×3168; 4976×2800)	1080p30 AVCHD	124×90×76 mm (4.9×3.5×3.0 in)	442 g (15.6 oz)	Yes	1.42×	1.53	Sep 21, 2010
10	Panasonic Lumix DMC-GF2		4:3	13.1 MP	12.1 MP (4000×3000)	1080p30 AVCHD	113×68×33 mm (4.4×2.7×1.3 in)	310 g (11 oz)	LVF1 (opt.)	1.04×	0.202	Nov 4, 2010
11	Olympus PEN E-PL1s		4:3	13.1 MP	12.3 MP (4032×3024)	720p30 MJPEG	115×72×42 mm (4.5×2.8×1.7 in)	334 g (11.8 oz)	VF-2 (opt.)	1.15×	1.44	Nov 16, 2010
12	Olympus PEN E-PL2		4:3	13.1 MP	12.3 MP (4032×3024)	720p30 MJPEG	114×72×42 mm (4.5×2.8×1.7 in)	362 g (12.8 oz)	VF-2 (opt.) (Note: This camera is equipped with the AP-2 accessory port, which also is compatible with the VF-3 and VF-4 EVFs, although the eye sensor of the VF-4 does not work on this camera and the VF-4 will operate with degraded resolution.)	1.15×	1.44	Jan 6, 2011
13	Panasonic Lumix DMC-G3		4:3	16.6 MP	15.8 MP (4592×3448)	1080p30 AVCHD	115×84×47 mm (4.5×3.3×1.9 in)	336 g (11.9 oz)	Yes	1.4×	1.44	May 12, 2011
14	Panasonic Lumix DMC-GF3		4:3	13.1 MP	12.1 MP (4000×3000)	1080i 30 AVCHD	108×67×32 mm (4.3×2.6×1.3 in)	264 g (9.3 oz)	No	—N/a		Jun 13, 2011
15	Olympus PEN E-P3		4:3	13.1 MP	12.3 MP (4032×3024)	1080p30 AVCHD	122×69×34 mm (4.8×2.7×1.3 in)	369 g (13.0 oz)	VF-2 (opt.) (Note: This camera is equipped with the AP-2 accessory port, which also is compatible with the VF-3 and VF-4 EVFs, although the eye sensor of the VF-4 does not work on this camera.)	1.15×	1.44	Jun 30, 2011
16	Olympus PEN E-PL3		4:3	13.1 MP	12.3 MP (4032×3024)	1080p30 AVCHD	110×64×37 mm (4.3×2.5×1.5 in)	313 g (11.0 oz)	VF-2 (opt.)	1.15×	1.44	Jun 30, 2011
17	Olympus PEN E-PM1		4:3	13.1 MP	12.3 MP (4032×3024)	1080p30 AVCHD	110×64×34 mm (4.3×2.5×1.3 in)	265 g (9.3 oz)	VF-2 (opt.)	1.15×	1.44	Jun 30, 2011
18	Panasonic Lumix DMC-GX1		4:3	16.6 MP	16 MP (4592×3448)	1080p30 AVCHD	116×68×39 mm (4.6×2.7×1.5 in)	318 g (11.2 oz)	LVF2 (opt.)	1.4×	1.44	Nov 7, 2011
19	Kodak Pixpro S-1		4:3	17 MP	16 MP (4640×3480)	1080p30 AVCHD	116×68×36 mm (4.6×2.7×1.4 in)	290 g (10 oz)	No	—N/a		Jan 18, 2012
20	Olympus OM-D E-M5		4:3	16.9 MP	16.1 MP (4608×3456)	1080p60 H.264	122×89×43 mm (4.8×3.5×1.7 in)	425 g (15.0 oz)	Yes	1.15×	1.44	Feb 8, 2012
21	Panasonic Lumix DMC-GF5		4:3	13.1 MP	12.1 MP (4000×3000)	1080i 30 AVCHD	108×67×37 mm (4.3×2.6×1.5 in)	267 g (9.4 oz)	No	—N/a		Apr 5, 2012
22	Panasonic Lumix DMC-G5		4:3	18.3 MP	16.1 MP (4608×3456)	1080p60 AVCHD	120×83×71 mm (4.7×3.3×2.8 in)	396 g (14.0 oz)	Yes	1.4×	1.44	Jul 18, 2012
23	Panasonic Lumix DMC-GH3		4:3	17.2 MP	16.05 MP (4608×3456)	1080p60 H.264	133×93×82 mm (5.2×3.7×3.2 in)	550 g (19 oz)	Yes	1.34×	1.74	Sep 17, 2012
24	Olympus PEN E-PL5		4:3	16.9 MP	16.1 MP (4608×3456)	1080p30 H.264	111×64×38 mm (4.4×2.5×1.5 in)	325 g (11.5 oz)	VF-2 (opt.)	1.15×	1.44	Sep 17, 2012
25	Olympus PEN E-PM2		4:3	16.9 MP	16.1 MP (4608×3456)	1080p30 H.264	110×64×34 mm (4.3×2.5×1.3 in)	269 g (9.5 oz)	VF-2 (opt.)	1.15×	1.44	Sep 17, 2012
26	Panasonic Lumix DMC-GF6		4:3	16.9 MP	16.1 MP (4592×3448)	1080p30 AVCHD	111×65×38 mm (4.4×2.6×1.5 in)	323 g (11.4 oz)	No	—N/a		Apr 9, 2013
27	Panasonic Lumix DMC-G6		4:3	18.3 MP	16.1 MP (4608×3456)	1080p60 AVCHD	122×85×71 mm (4.8×3.3×2.8 in)	390 g (14 oz)	Yes	1.4x	1.44	Apr 24, 2013
28	Olympus PEN E-P5		4:3	17 MP	16.05 MP (4608×3456)	1080p30 H.264	122×69×37 mm (4.8×2.7×1.5 in)	420 g (15 oz)	VF-4 (opt.) (Note: This camera is equipped with the AP-2 accessory port, which is compatible with the VF-2, VF-3 and VF-4 EVFs.)	1.48×	2.36	May 10, 2013
29	Olympus PEN E-PL6		4:3	17 MP	16.05 MP (4608×3456)	1080p30 MJPEG	111×64×38 mm (4.4×2.5×1.5 in)	325 g (11.5 oz)	VF-4 (opt.)	1.48×	2.36	May 10, 2013
30	Panasonic Lumix DMC-GX7		4:3	17 MP	16 MP (4592×3448)	1080p60 AVCHD	123×71×55 mm (4.8×2.8×2.2 in)	402 g (14.2 oz)	Yes	1.39×	2.76	Aug 1, 2013
31	Olympus OM-D E-M1		4:3	17 MP	16 MP (4608×3456)	1080p30 H.264	130×94×63 mm (5.1×3.7×2.5 in)	497 g (17.5 oz)	Yes	1.48×	2.36	Sep 10, 2013
32	Panasonic Lumix DMC-GM1		4:3	17 MP	16 MP (4592×3448)	1080p24 AVCHD	99×55×30 mm (3.9×2.2×1.2 in)	204 g (7.2 oz)	No	—N/a		Oct 17, 2013
33	Olympus OM-D E-M10		4:3	17 MP	16 MP (4608×3456)	1080p30 H.264	119×82×46 mm (4.7×3.2×1.8 in)	396 g (14.0 oz)	Yes	1.15×	1.44	Jan 29, 2014
34	Panasonic Lumix DMC-GH4		4:3	17 MP	16 MP (4608×3456)	4K 24p H.264	133×93×84 mm (5.2×3.7×3.3 in)	560 g (20 oz)	Yes	1.34×	2.36	Feb 7, 2014
35	Olympus PEN E-PL7		4:3	17.2 MP	16.1 MP (4608×3456)	1080p30 H.264	115×67×38 mm (4.5×2.6×1.5 in)	357 g (12.6 oz)	VF-4 (opt.)	1.48×	2.36	Aug 28, 2014
36	Panasonic Lumix DMC-GM5		4:3	17 MP	16 MP (4592×3448)	1080p60 AVCHD	99×60×36 mm (3.9×2.4×1.4 in)	211 g (7.4 oz)	Yes	0.92×	1.17	Sep 15, 2014
37	Panasonic Lumix DMC-GF7		4:3	17 MP	16 MP (4592×3448)	1080p60 H.264	107×65×33 mm (4.2×2.6×1.3 in)	266 g (9.4 oz)	No	—N/a		Jan 20, 2015
38	Olympus OM-D E-M5 II		4:3	17 MP	16 MP (4608×3456)	1080p60 H.264	124×85×45 mm (4.9×3.3×1.8 in)	469 g (16.5 oz)	Yes	1.48×	2.36	Feb 5, 2015
39	Olympus Air A01		4:3	17 MP	16 MP (4608×3456)	1080p30 H.264	57×57×44 mm (2.2×2.2×1.7 in)	147 g (5.2 oz)	No	—N/a		Feb 5, 2015
40	Panasonic Lumix DMC-G7		4:3	17 MP	16.8 MP (4592×3448)	4K 30p AVCHD	125×86×77 mm (4.9×3.4×3.0 in)	410 g (14 oz)	Yes	1.4×	2.36	May 18, 2015
41	Panasonic Lumix DMC-GX8		4:3	22 MP	20 MP (5184×3888)	4K 30p AVCHD	133×78×63 mm (5.2×3.1×2.5 in)	487 g (17.2 oz)	Yes	1.54×	2.36	Jul 16, 2015
42	Olympus OM-D E-M10 Mark II		4:3	17 MP	16 MP (4608×3456)	1080p60 H.264	120×83×47 mm (4.7×3.3×1.9 in)	390 g (14 oz)	Yes	1.23×	2.36	Aug 25, 2015
43	DJI Zenmuse X5		4:3	16 MP	16 MP (4608×3456)	4K 24p H.264	120×135×140 mm (4.7×5.3×5.5 in)	530 g (19 oz)	No	—N/a		Sep 2015
44	Olympus PEN-F		4:3	22 MP	20 MP (5184×3888)	1080p60 H.264	125×72×37 mm (4.9×2.8×1.5 in)	427 g (15.1 oz)	Yes	1.08 – 1.23×	2.36	Jan 27, 2016
45	Panasonic Lumix DMC-GX80/DMC-GX85/GX7 Mark II		4:3	17 MP	16 MP (4592×3448)	4K 30p AVCHD	122×71×44 mm (4.8×2.8×1.7 in)	426 g (15.0 oz)	Yes	1.39×	2.76	Apr 5, 2016
46	Panasonic Lumix DMC-G85/G80		4:3	17 MP	16MP (4592×3448)	4K 30p AVCHD	128×89×74 mm (5.0×3.5×2.9 in)	505 g (17.8 oz)	Yes	1.48×	2.36	Sep 19, 2016
47	Olympus OM-D E-M1 Mark II		4:3	22 MP	20 MP (5184×3888)	4K 24p H.264	134×91×67 mm (5.3×3.6×2.6 in)	574 g (20.2 oz)	Yes	1.48×	2.36	Sep 19, 2016
48	Olympus PEN E-PL8		4:3	17 MP	16 MP (4608×3456)	1080p60 H.264	115×67×38 mm (4.5×2.6×1.5 in)	357 g (12.6 oz)	VF-4 (opt.)	1.48×	2.36	Sep 19, 2016
49	YI M1		4:3	22 MP	20 MP (5184×3888)	4K 30p H.264	114×64×34 mm (4.5×2.5×1.3 in)	281 g (9.9 oz)	No	—N/a		Sep 19, 2016
50	Panasonic Lumix DC-GH5		4:3	22 MP	20 MP (5184×3888)	4K 24p H.264	139×98×87 mm (5.5×3.9×3.4 in)	725 g (25.6 oz)	Yes	1.52×	3.68	Jan 4, 2017
51	Panasonic Lumix DC-GF9/DC-GX800/DC-GX850		4:3	17 MP	16MP (4592×3448)	4K 30p H.264	107×65×33 mm (4.2×2.6×1.3 in)	269 g (9.5 oz)	No	—N/a		Jan 4, 2017
52	Olympus OM-D E-M10 Mark III		4:3	17 MP	16 MP (4608×3456)	4K 30p H.264	122×84×50 mm (4.8×3.3×2.0 in)	410 g (14 oz)	Yes	1.23×	2.36	Aug 31, 2017
53	Panasonic Lumix DC-G9		4:3	22 MP	20 MP (5184×3888)	4K 60p H.264	137×97×92 mm (5.4×3.8×3.6 in)	658 g (23.2 oz)	Yes	1.68×	3.68	Nov 8, 2017
54	Panasonic Lumix DC-GH5S		4:3; 3:2; 16:9 (multi-aspect)	12 MP	10 MP (3680×2760; 3840×2560; 4016×2256)	4K 60p H.264	139×98×87 mm (5.5×3.9×3.4 in)	660 g (23 oz)	Yes	1.52×	3.68	Jan 8, 2018
55	Panasonic Lumix DC-GF10/DC-GF90/DC-GX880		4:3	17 MP	16 MP (4592×3448)	4K 30p H.264	107×65×33 mm (4.2×2.6×1.3 in)	270 g (9.5 oz)	No	—N/a		Feb 1, 2018
56	Olympus PEN E-PL9		4:3	17 MP	16 MP (4608×3456)	4K 30p H.264	117×68×39 mm (4.6×2.7×1.5 in)	380 g (13 oz)	No	—N/a		Feb 7, 2018
57	Panasonic Lumix DC-GX9	Panasonic Lumix DC-GX9 Camera	4:3	22 MP	20 MP (5184×3888)	4K 30p H.264	124×72×47 mm (4.9×2.8×1.9 in)	450 g (16 oz)	Yes	1.39×	2.76	Feb 13, 2018
58	Olympus OM-D E-M1X		4:3	22 MP	20 MP (5184×3888)	4K 24p H.264	144×147×75 mm (5.7×5.8×3.0 in)	997 g (35.2 oz)	Yes	1.65×	2.36 120 Hz	Jan 24, 2019
59	Panasonic Lumix DC-G90/G91/G95		4:3	22 MP	20 MP (5184×3888)	4K 30p H.264	130×94×77 mm (5.1×3.7×3.0 in)	536 g (18.9 oz)	Yes	1.48×	2.36	Apr 5, 2019
60	Olympus OM-D E-M5 Mark III		4:3	22 MP	20 MP (5184×3888)	4K 30p H.264	125×85×50 mm (4.9×3.3×2.0 in)	414 g (14.6 oz)	Yes	1.37×	2.36	Oct 17, 2019
61	Olympus PEN E-PL10		4:3	17 MP	16 MP (4608×3456)	4K 30p H.264	117×68×39 mm (4.6×2.7×1.5 in)	380 g (13 oz)	No	—N/a		Oct 17, 2019
62	Olympus OM-D E-M1 Mark III		4:3	22 MP	20 MP (5184×3888)	4K 24p H.264	134×91×69 mm (5.3×3.6×2.7 in)	580 g (20 oz)	Yes	1.48×	2.36	Feb 12, 2020
63	Panasonic Lumix DC-G100		4:3	22 MP	20.3 MP (5184×3888)	4K 30p H.264	116×83×54 mm (4.6×3.3×2.1 in)	352 g (12.4 oz)	Yes	1.46×	3.68	Jun 24, 2020
64	Olympus OM-D E-M10 Mark IV		4:3	22 MP	20 MP (5184×3888)	4K 30p H.264	122×84×49 mm (4.8×3.3×1.9 in)	383 g (13.5 oz)	Yes	0.62×	2.36	Aug 4, 2020
65	Panasonic Lumix DC-GH5M2		4:3	22 MP	20.3 MP (5184×3888)	4K 60p H.265	139×98×87 mm (5.5×3.9×3.4 in)	727 g (25.6 oz)	Yes	1.52×	3.68 OLED	May 25, 2021
66	Olympus PEN E-P7		4:3	22 MP	20.3 MP (5184×3888)	4K 30p H.264	118×69×38 mm (4.6×2.7×1.5 in)	337 g (11.9 oz)	No	—N/a		Jun 9, 2021
67	OM System OM-1		4:3	22 MP	20 MP (5184×3888)	4K 60p H.265	135×92×73 mm (5.3×3.6×2.9 in)	599 g (21.1 oz)	Yes	1.65×	5.76 OLED	Feb 15, 2022
68	Panasonic Lumix DC-GH6		4:3	27 MP	25 MP (5776×4336)	4K 60p H.265	138×100×100 mm (5.4×3.9×3.9 in)	823 g (29.0 oz)	Yes	1.52×	3.69	Feb 22, 2022
69	OM System OM-5		4:3	22 MP	20 MP (5184×3888)	4K 24p H.264	125×85×50 mm (4.9×3.3×2.0 in)	414 g (14.6 oz)	Yes	1.37×	2.36 OLED	Oct 26, 2022
70	Panasonic Lumix DC-G9 II		4:3	27 MP	25 MP (5776×4336)	6K 30p H.265	134×102×90 mm (5.3×4.0×3.5 in)	658 g (23.2 oz)	Yes	1.6×	3.69	Sep 12, 2023
71	OM System OM-1 Mark II		4:3	23 MP	20 MP (5184×3888)	4K 60p H.265	138×91×72 mm (5.4×3.6×2.8 in)	599 g (21.1 oz)	Yes	1.65×	5.76 OLED	Jan 30, 2024
72	Panasonic Lumix DC-GH7		4:3	27 MP	25 MP (5776×4336)	6K 60p H.265	138×100×100 mm (5.4×3.9×3.9 in)	805 g (28.4 oz)	Yes	1.6×	3.69	Jun 5, 2024
73	Panasonic Lumix DC-G97		4:3	23 MP	20 MP (5184×3888)	4K 30p H.265	130×93×77 mm (5.1×3.7×3.0 in)	478 g (16.9 oz)	Yes	1.6×	3.69	Feb 6, 2025
74	OM System OM-3		4:3	23 MP	20 MP (5184×3888)	4K 60p H.265	139×89×46 mm (5.5×3.5×1.8 in)	496 g (17.5 oz)	Yes	1.65×	2.36 OLED	Feb 6, 2025
75	OM System PEN		4:3	21.8 MP	20 MP (5184×3888)	4K 30p H.264	125×74×43 mm (4.9×2.9×1.7 in)	393 g (13.9 oz)	Yes	1.23x	2.36 OLED	Sept 9, 2026

Timeline of Olympus Micro Four Thirds Cameras

=== Video-focused and industrial ===
These cameras feature limited features for still image recording, as they are intended primarily for video production and industrial applications, including machine vision.

Micro Four Thirds system video and industrial camera bodies
Item	Model	Image	Image sensor				Dimensions		Electronic View Finder (EVF)			Announced
Item	Model	Image	Aspect ratio(s)	Size	Resolution & frame rate	Codec(s)	W×H×D	Wgt.	Built-in	Size	Res. (Mdots)	Announced
1	Panasonic AG-AF100 AVCCAM Memory Card Camera Recorder		4:3 (masked to 16:9)	17.8 × 10 mm	1080p24	AVCHD	163×195×209.4 mm (6.4×7.7×8.2 in)	1,200 g (42 oz)	Yes	1.14 cm (0.45 in)	1.23	Sep 13, 2010
2	Blackmagic Cinema Camera MFT		16:9	15.81 × 8.88 mm	2.5K (2432×1366), 30p	ProRes, CinemaDNG	166.2×126.49×113.51 mm (6.5×5.0×4.5 in)	1,500 g (53 oz)	No	—N/a		Sep 7, 2012
3	Blackmagic Pocket Cinema Camera		16:9	Super 16 (12.48 × 7.02 mm)	1080p30	ProRes, CinemaDNG	128×66×38 mm (5.0×2.6×1.5 in)	355 g (12.5 oz)	No	—N/a		Apr 8, 2013
4	Blackmagic Studio Camera		16:9	12.48 × 7.02 mm (HD)	1080p60	(3G-SDI)	255×195×114 mm (10.05×7.66×4.47 in)	2,010 g (4.44 lb)	No	—N/a		Apr 7, 2014
4	Blackmagic Studio Camera		16:9	13.056 × 7.344 mm (4K)	4K (3840×2160), 60p	(12G-SDI)	255×195×114 mm (10.05×7.66×4.47 in)	2,010 g (4.44 lb)	No	—N/a		Apr 7, 2014
5	JVC GY-LS300 4KCAM Handheld S35 mm Camcorder		16:9	Super 35	4K 30p	AVCHD	135×191×359 mm (5.3×7.5×14.1 in)	1,600 g (3.6 lb)	Yes	0.24 in (6.1 mm)	1.56	Feb 2015
6	Blackmagic Micro Cinema Camera		16:9	Super 16 (12.48 × 7.02 mm)	1080p30	CinemaDNG, ProRes	83×70×65 mm (3.25×2.74×2.57 in)	310 g (11 oz)	No	—N/a		Apr 13, 2015
7	Blackmagic Micro Studio Camera 4K		16:9	13.056 × 7.344 mm	4K (3840×2160), 30p	(6G-SDI)	83×70×65 mm (3.25×2.74×2.57 in)	310 g (11 oz)	No	—N/a		Apr 13, 2015
8	Z CAM E1		4:3	?	4K 24p	H.264	75.2×56.1×50.25 mm (3.0×2.2×2.0 in)	216.6 g (7.64 oz)	No	—N/a		Jul 2015
9	Blackmagic Pocket Cinema Camera 4K		16:9	18.96×10 mm	4K DCI 60p	Blackmagic RAW, ProRes 422	178×97×86 mm (7×3.8×3.4 in)	720 g (1.59 lb)	No	—N/a		Apr 2018

Brand	Form	Class	2008	2009	2010	2011			2012	2013	2014	2015	2016	2017	2018	2019	2020	2021	2022	2023	2024	2025	2026
Olympus	SLR style OM-D	Professional															E-M1X ^{R}						
Olympus	SLR style OM-D	High-end									E-M1			E-M1 II ^{R}			E-M1 III ^{R}						
Olympus	SLR style OM-D	Advanced							E-M5			E-M5 II ^{R}					E-M5 III ^{R}						
Olympus	SLR style OM-D	Mid-range									E-M10		E-M10 II		E-M10 III			E-M10 IV					
Olympus	Rangefinder style PEN	Mid-range		E-P1	E-P2		E-P3				E-P5		PEN-F ^{R}										
Olympus	Rangefinder style PEN	Upper-entry			E-PL1	E-PL2		E-PL3	E-PL5		E-PL6	E-PL7		E-PL8	E-PL9		E-PL10						
Olympus	Rangefinder style PEN	Entry-level					E-PM1		E-PM2														
Olympus	remote													Air									
OM System	SLR style	Professional																	OM-1 ^{R}		OM-1 II ^{R}		
OM System	SLR style	High-end																				OM-3 ^{R}	
OM System	SLR style	Advanced																		OM-5 ^{R}			OM-5 II ^{R}
OM System	PEN	Mid-range																	E-P7				
Panasonic	SLR style	High-end Video													GH5S				GH6 ^{R}			GH7 ^{R}	
Panasonic	SLR style	High-end Photo													G9 ^{R}						G9 II ^{R}		
Panasonic	SLR style	High-end		GH1		GH2			GH3		GH4				GH5				GH5II				
Panasonic	SLR style	Mid-range		G1	G2		G3		G5		G6		G7	G80/G85			G90/G95						
Panasonic	SLR style	Entry-level			G10													G100			G100D		
Panasonic	Rangefinder style	Advanced							GX1		GX7		GX8		GX9								
Panasonic	Rangefinder style	Mid-range									GM1	GM5	GX80/GX85										
Panasonic	Rangefinder style	Entry-level			GF1	GF2	GF3		GF5		GF6	GF7	GF8	GX800/GX850/GF9		GX880/GF10/GF90							
Panasonic	Camcorder	Professional							AG-AF104														
Kodak	Rangefinder style	Entry-level										S-1											
DJI	Drone	.												Zenmuse X5S									
DJI	Drone	.												Zenmuse X5									
YI	Rangefinder style	Entry-level												M1									
Yongnuo	Rangefinder style	Android camera															YN450M		YN455				
Blackmagic Design	Rangefinder style	High-End Video							Cinema Camera														
Blackmagic Design	Rangefinder style	High-End Video									Pocket Cinema Camera					Pocket Cinema Camera 4K							
Blackmagic Design		High-End Video										Micro Cinema Camera									Micro Studio Camera 4K G2		
Z CAM	Cinema	Advanced											E1			E2							
Z CAM	Cinema	Mid-Range																E2-M4					
Z CAM	Cinema	Entry-Level															E2C						
JVC	Camcorder	Professional										GY-LS300											
SVS-Vistek		Industrial							EVO Tracer														
