= Olympus OM-D series =

Digital camera series by Olympus

The Olympus OM-D series is a series of Micro Four-Thirds digital Mirrorless Interchangeable Lens Cameras started by Olympus Corporation. Olympus's camera division was acquired by Japan Industrial Partners in 2021 and they will continue the OM-D series in the future.

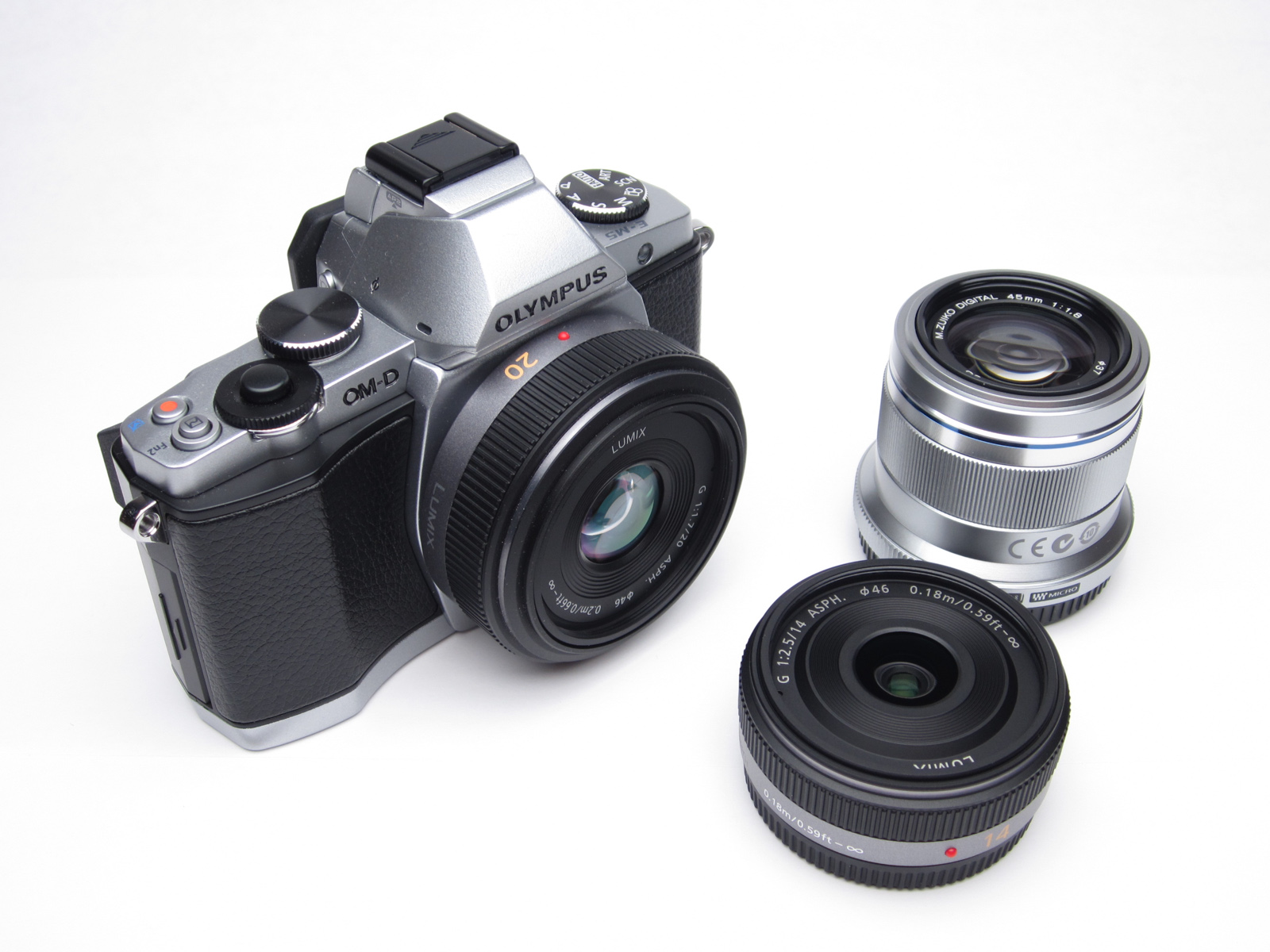
Olympus OM-D E-M5, introduced in 2012.

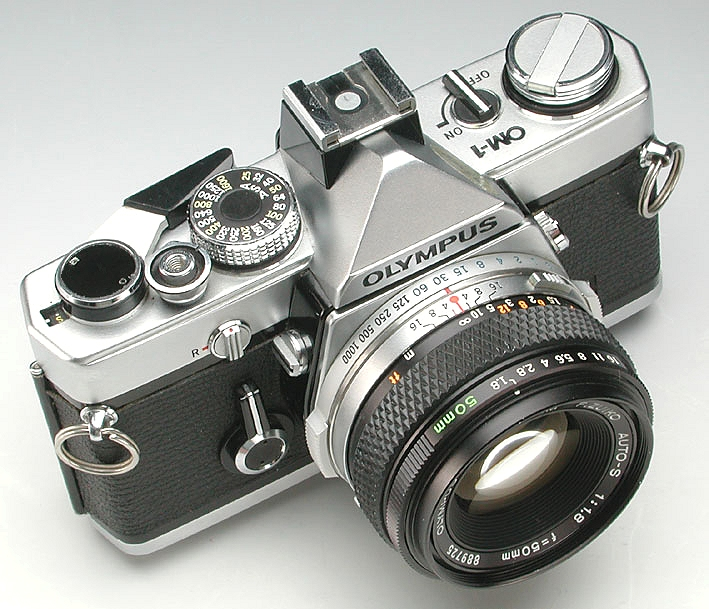
Olympus OM-1, introduced in 1972

It is the resuscitation of the OM series from the 1970s and 1980s, implementing the same kind of design language, but equipped with technology that meets the standards of the 2010s, like a digital image sensor or video recording capabilities.

The OM-D series is currently the highest-end line of Olympus cameras, categorized above PEN mirrorless and Stylus point and shoot cameras.

== Differences between models ==
There are three main categories in the OM-D series:

- E-M10
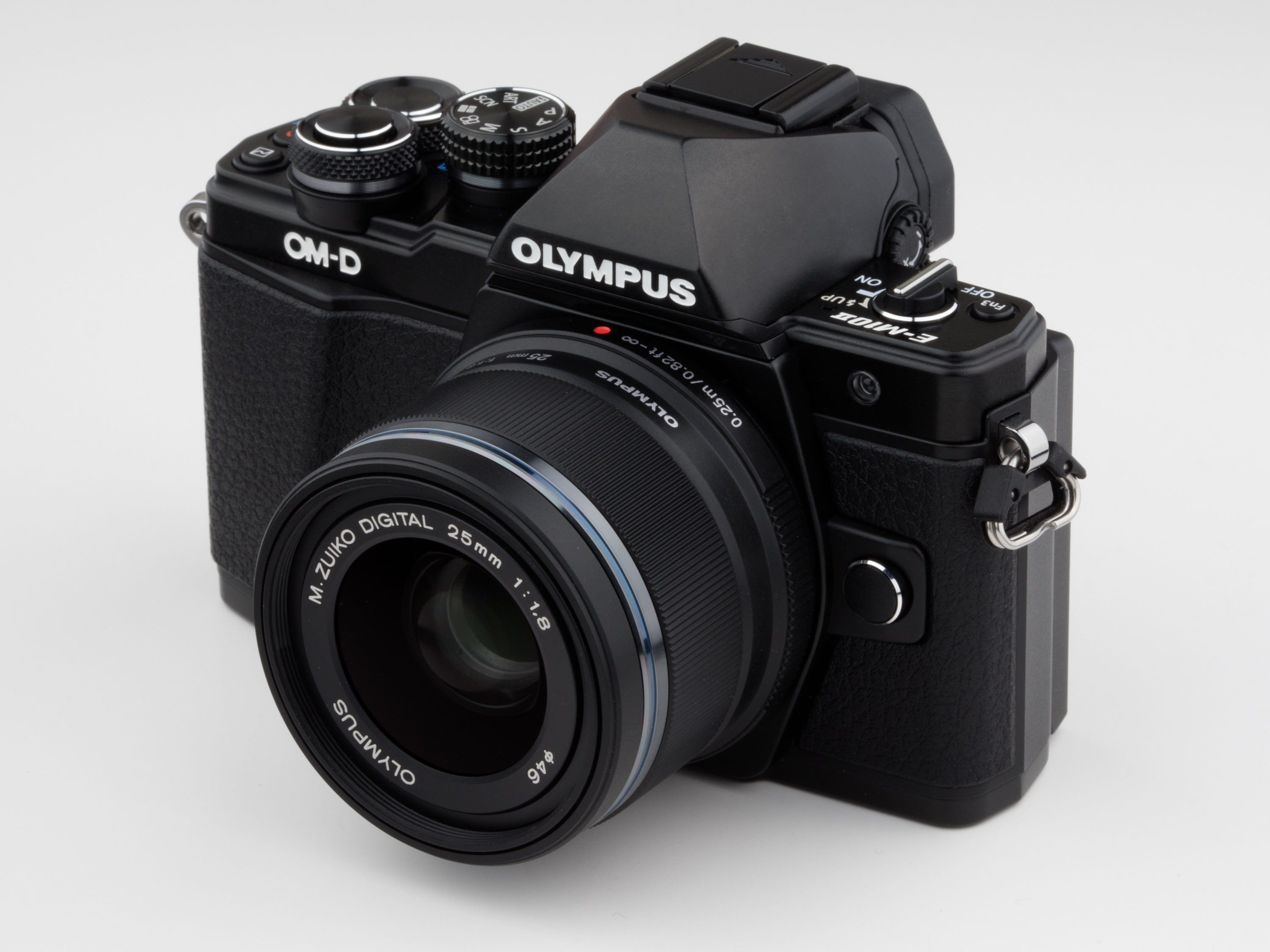
  Olympus OM-D E-M10 Mark II
  - The lowest-end OM-D category.
  - Beginner-friendly design.
  - Built-in flash.
  - Least expensive.
  - In absolute terms, a mid-range line.
  - Newest model: E-M10 Mark IV.
- E-M5
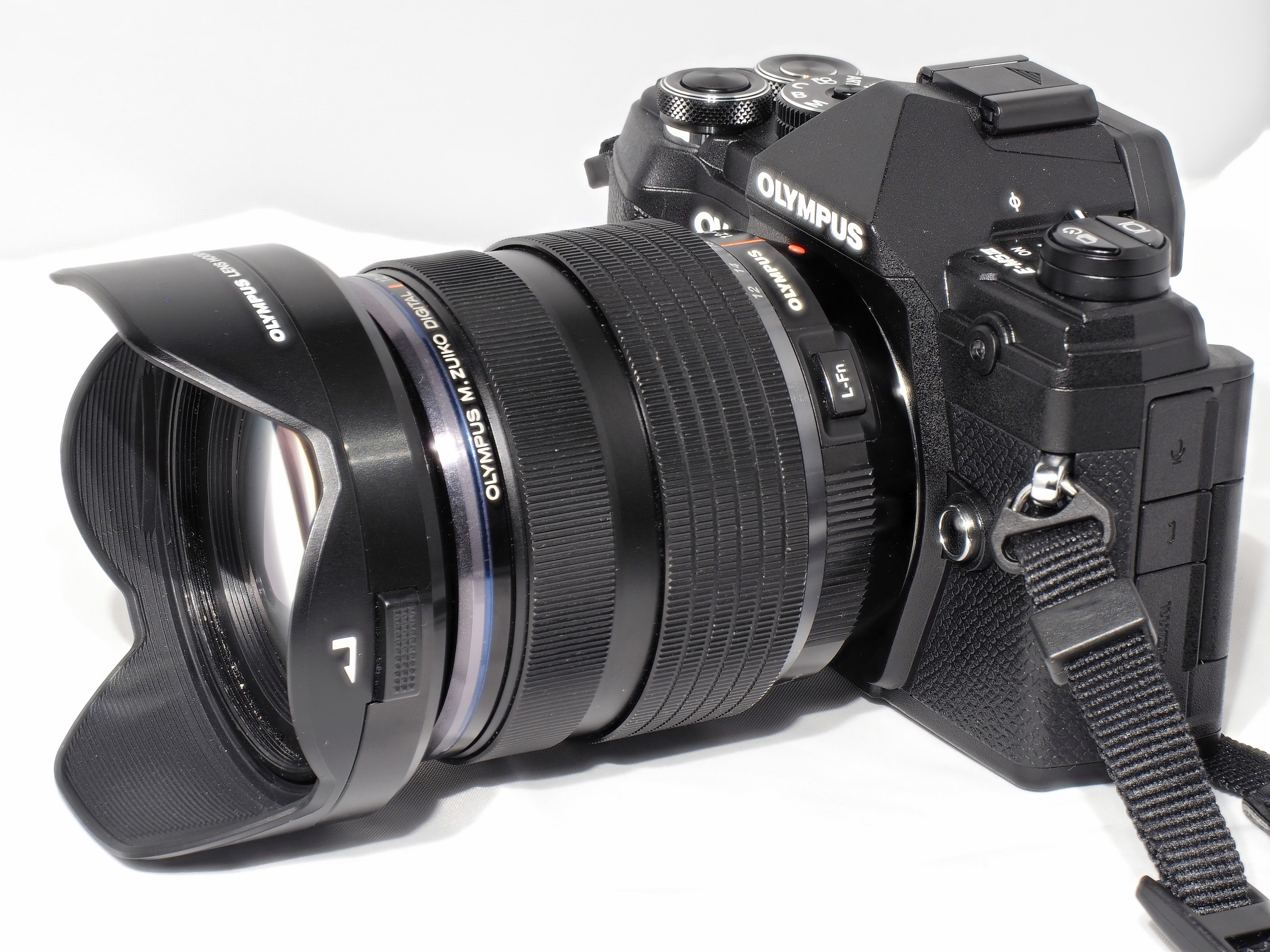
  Olympus OM-D E-M5 Mark III
  - Mid-tier in the OM-D family.
  - Made for enthusiasts.
  - Weather resistance
  - Moderately expensive.
  - In absolute terms, a high mid-range line.
  - Newest model: E-M5 Mark III.
- E-M1
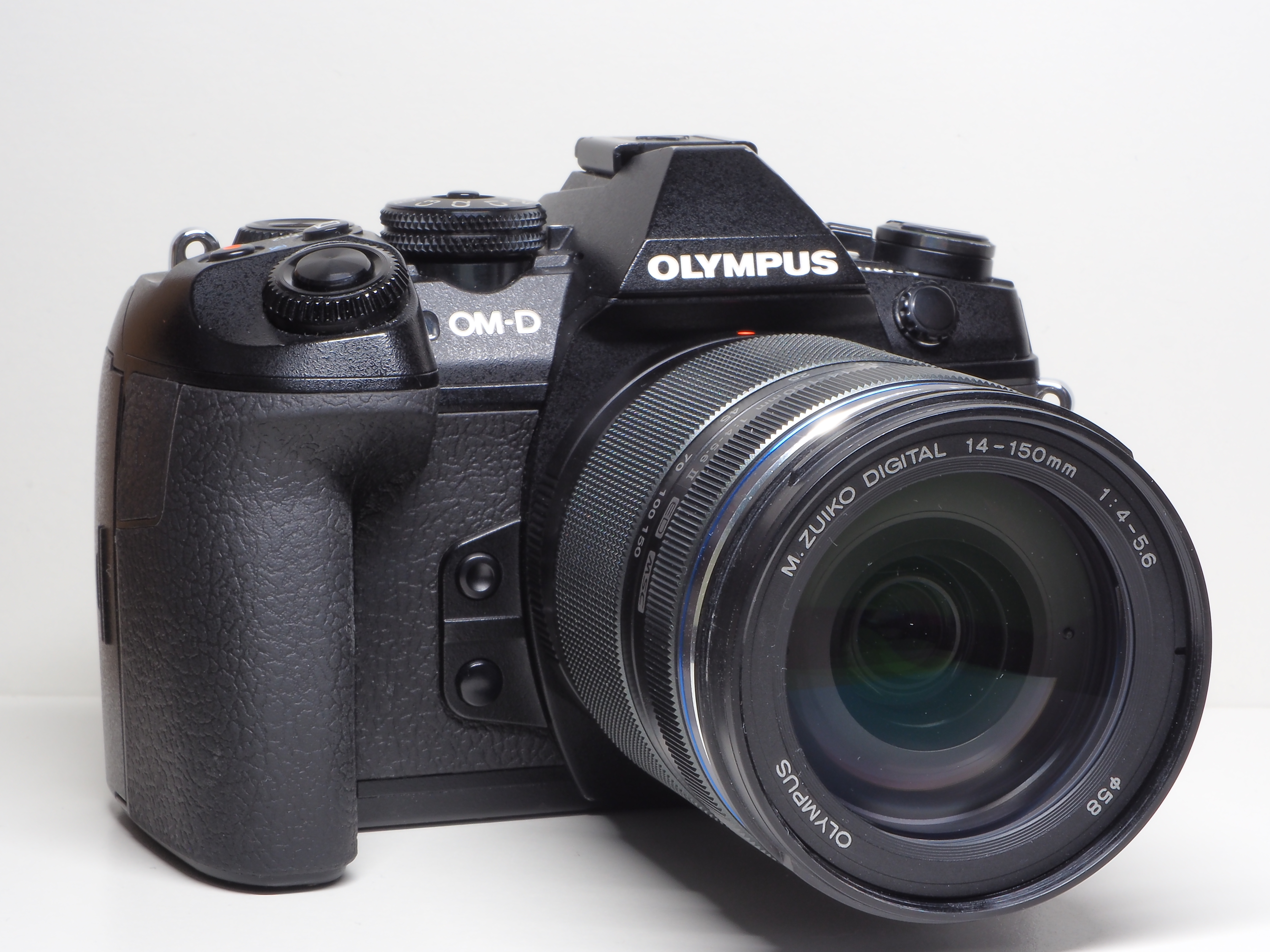
  Olympus OM-D E-M1 Mark II
  - The highest-end OM-D category.
  - Professional design and professional features.
  - Large grip.
  - Most expensive.
  - Advanced video features.
  - In absolute terms, a professional line.
  - Newest model: E-M1 Mark III.
    - E-M1X
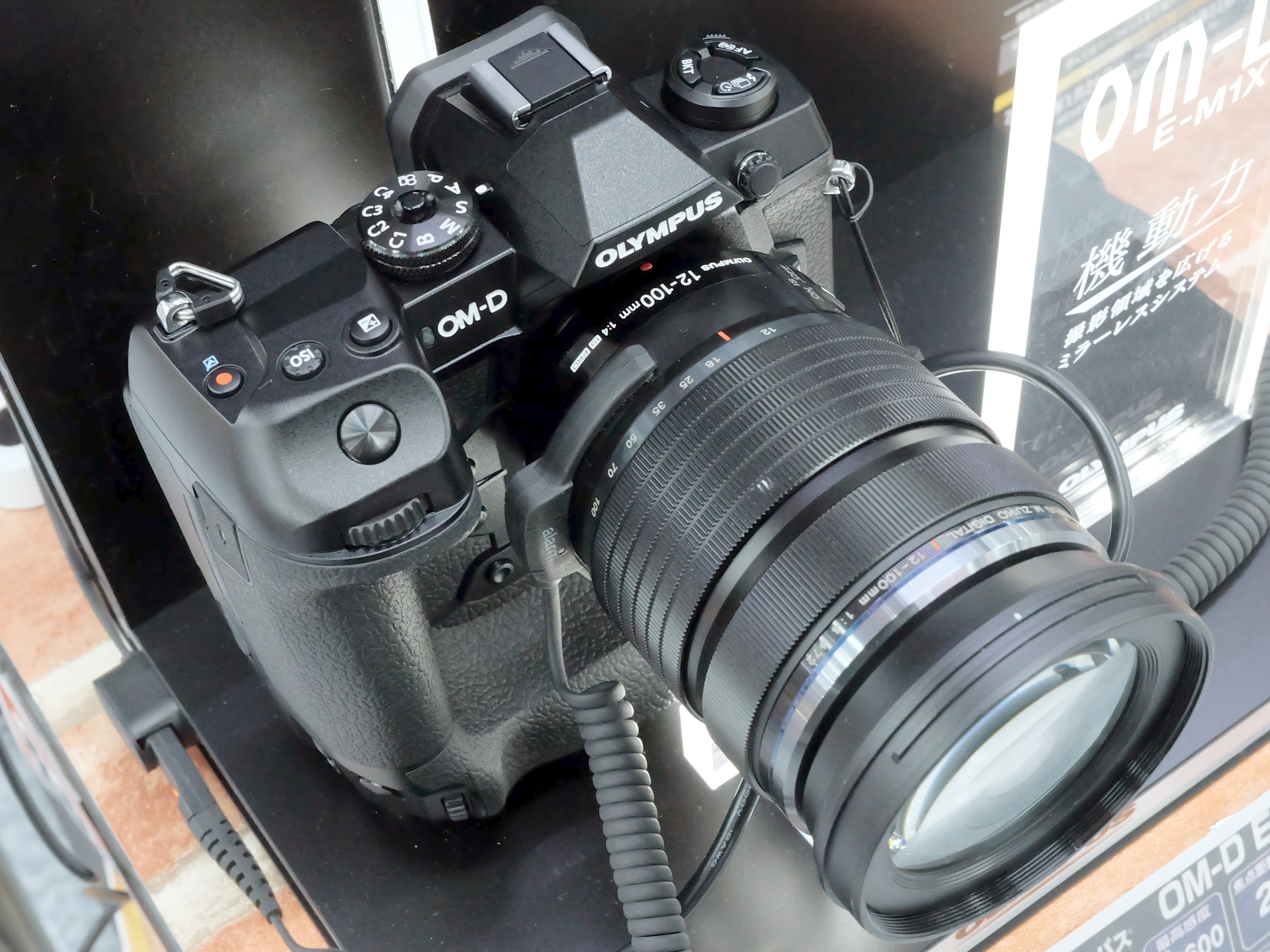
      Olympus OM-D E-M1X
      - Highest-end OM-D camera based on the E-M1 Mark II, introduced in 2018.
      - Built-in vertical grip.
      - Very ergonomic handling and button layout.
      - Very large EVF magnification.
      - Almost twice as heavy as the E-M1 II.
      - Long battery life.

The main difference between them is the ergonomics and the customizability. Most of the features are present all across the OM-D family, but the handling, the durability, and the accessibility of the features differ in favour of the more expensive categories.

== List of OM-D cameras ==
Name	Category	Photo resolution	Video resolution	Release date
OM-D E-M5	Enthusiast	16 megapixels	1080p 30 fps	February 2012
OM-D E-M1	Pro	16 megapixels	1080p 30 fps	September 2013
OM-D E-M10	Entry-level	16 megapixels	1080p 30 fps	January 2014
OM-D E-M5 Mark II	Enthusiast	16 megapixels	1080p 60 fps	February 2015
OM-D E-M10 Mark II	Entry-level	16 megapixels	1080p 60 fps	August 2015
OM-D E-M1 Mark II	Pro	20 megapixels	2160p 30 fps	October 2016
OM-D E-M10 Mark III	Entry-level	16 megapixels	2160p 30 fps	August 2017
OM-D E-M1X	Pro	20 megapixels	2160p 30 fps	January 2019
OM-D E-M5 Mark III	Enthusiast	20 megapixels	2160p 30 fps	October 2019
OM-D E-M1 Mark III	Pro	20 megapixels	2160p 30 fps	February 2020
OM-D E-M10 Mark IV	Entry-level	20 megapixels	2160p 30 fps	August 2020

== Reviews ==
Space.com called the OM-D E-M10 Mark IV camera "a small and neat little package that packs in excellent quality and usability", recommending it for beginners and enthusiasts when traveling.
