= Panasonic Lumix G 25mm F1.7 ASPH =

Micro four thirds camera lens

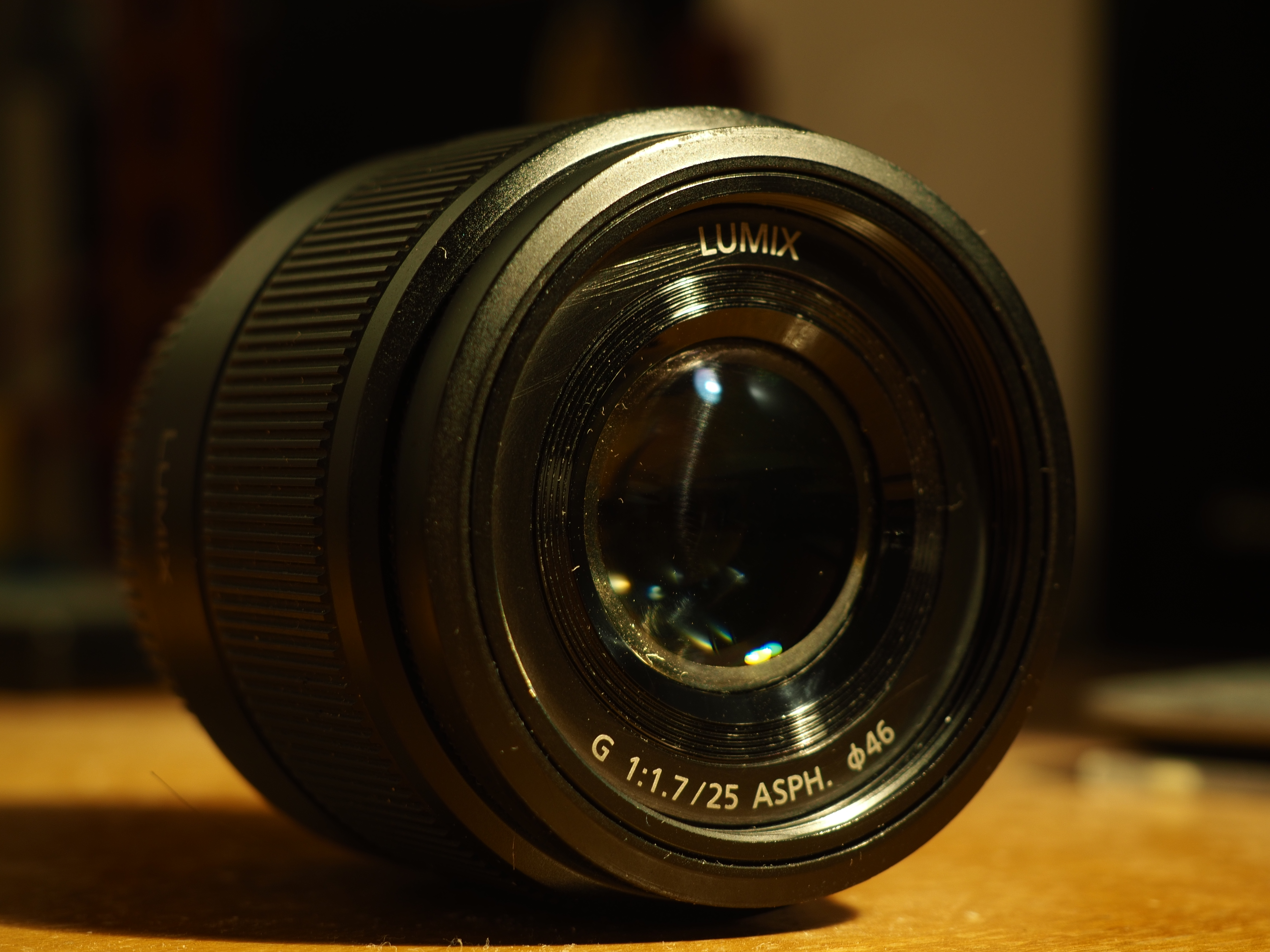
- Maker: Panasonic
- Lens mount(s): Micro Four Thirds
- Part number: H-H025E

Technical data
- Type: Prime
- Focus drive: Stepper motor
- Focal length: 25mm
- Focal length (35mm equiv.): 50mm
- Crop factor: 47°
- Aperture (max/min): max f1.7 min f22
- Close focus distance: 0.25 metres (0.82 ft)
- Max. magnification: 0.14 (0.28× 35mm equivalent)
- Diaphragm blades: 7
- Construction: 8 elements in 7 groups

Features
- Manual focus override: No No
- Weather-sealing: No No
- Lens-based stabilization: No No
- Aperture ring: No No

Physical
- Max. length: 52 mm (2.0 in)
- Diameter: 61 mm (2.4 in)
- Weight: 125 grams (0.276 lb)
- Filter diameter: 46 mm (1.8 in)

Accessories
- Lens hood: Panasonic SYQ0570

History
- Introduction: September 2015

Retail info
- MSRP: 249.99 USD

The Panasonic Lumix G 25mm F1.7 ASPH is a fixed focal length interchangeable camera lens announced by Panasonic on September 2, 2015.

It has a stepper-motor autofocus and electronic aperture control. The focus ring is not mechanically connected to the lens elements, which means that the manual focus is also controlled through the autofocus motor. The focus ring has a variable transmission depending on how fast it is turned.

It is a product in the Micro Four Thirds system. That means it is fully compatible with every Micro Four Thirds camera body, not just Panasonic, but Olympus, Xiaomi, Kodak and Blackmagic cameras as well. This also means that it is made for cameras with a 17.3 × 13 mm (FourThirds) image sensor, which has a 2× crop compared to 35mm cameras. Therefore, this lens has an equivalent focal length of 50mm.

This lens has an 'HD' badge on it, which means its capable of high quality video recording with silent and smooth autofocus.

It has eight lens elements in seven groups. Two of them are aspherical, which are used to maintain image quality while using less elements. There is also one ultra-high reflection element.

The lens has a seven-blade aperture diagram for stopped-down background blur quality.

The minimum focus distance is 25 cm (0.25 m; 0.82 ft) and the maximum magnification is 0.14× (0.28× 35mm equivalent) of this lens, so it is not a macro lens at all.

The Panasonic 25mm F1.7 lens is available in two colors: black and silver.

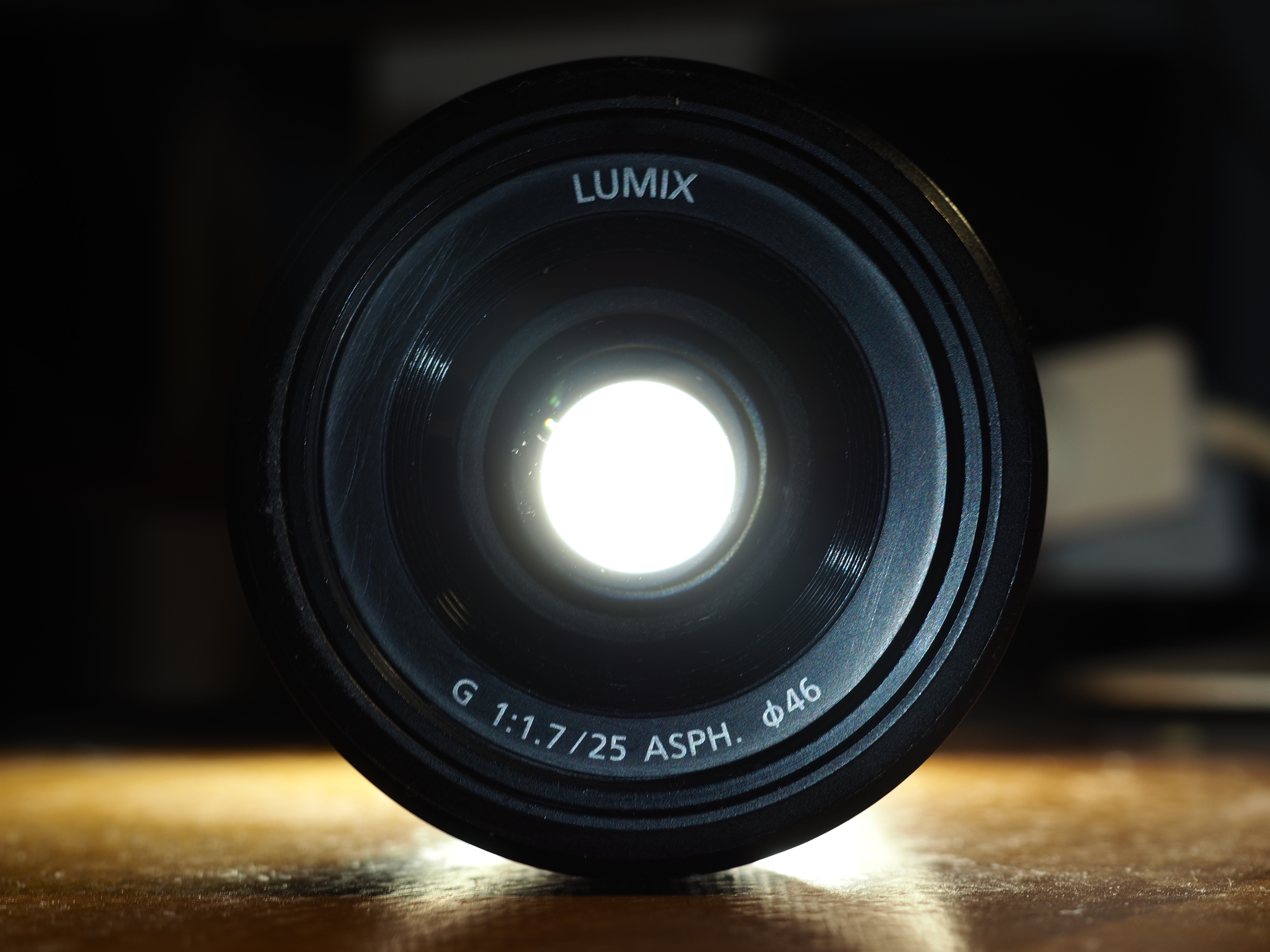
The Panasonic Lumix G 25mm F1.7 ASPH opens up to a fairly wide, f/1.7 aperture, which makes it capable of low-light shooting with relatively fast shutter speeds and low sensitivities.

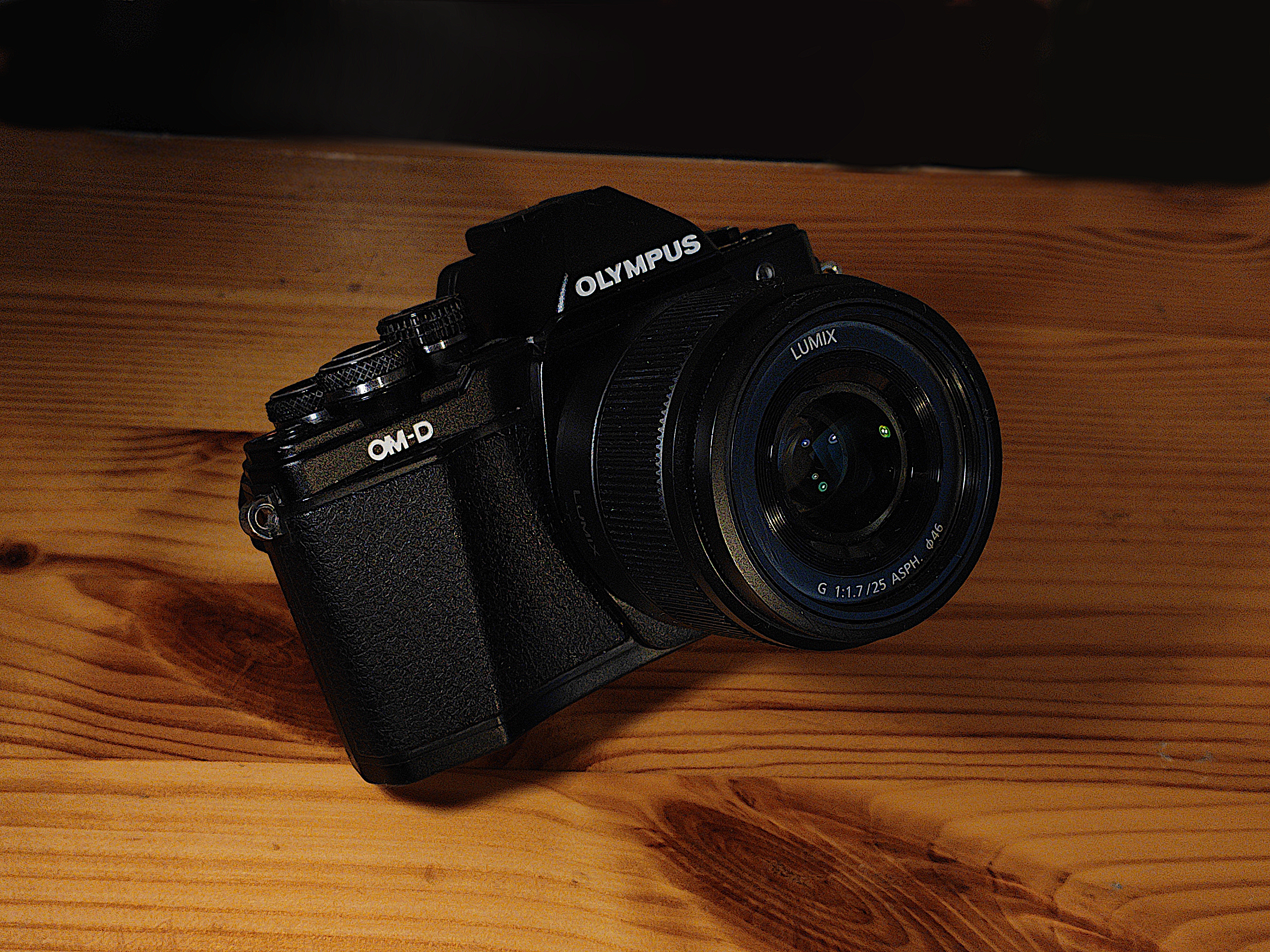
The Panasonic Lumix G 25mm F1.7 ASPH mounted on an Olympus OM-D E-M10 Mark II camera body

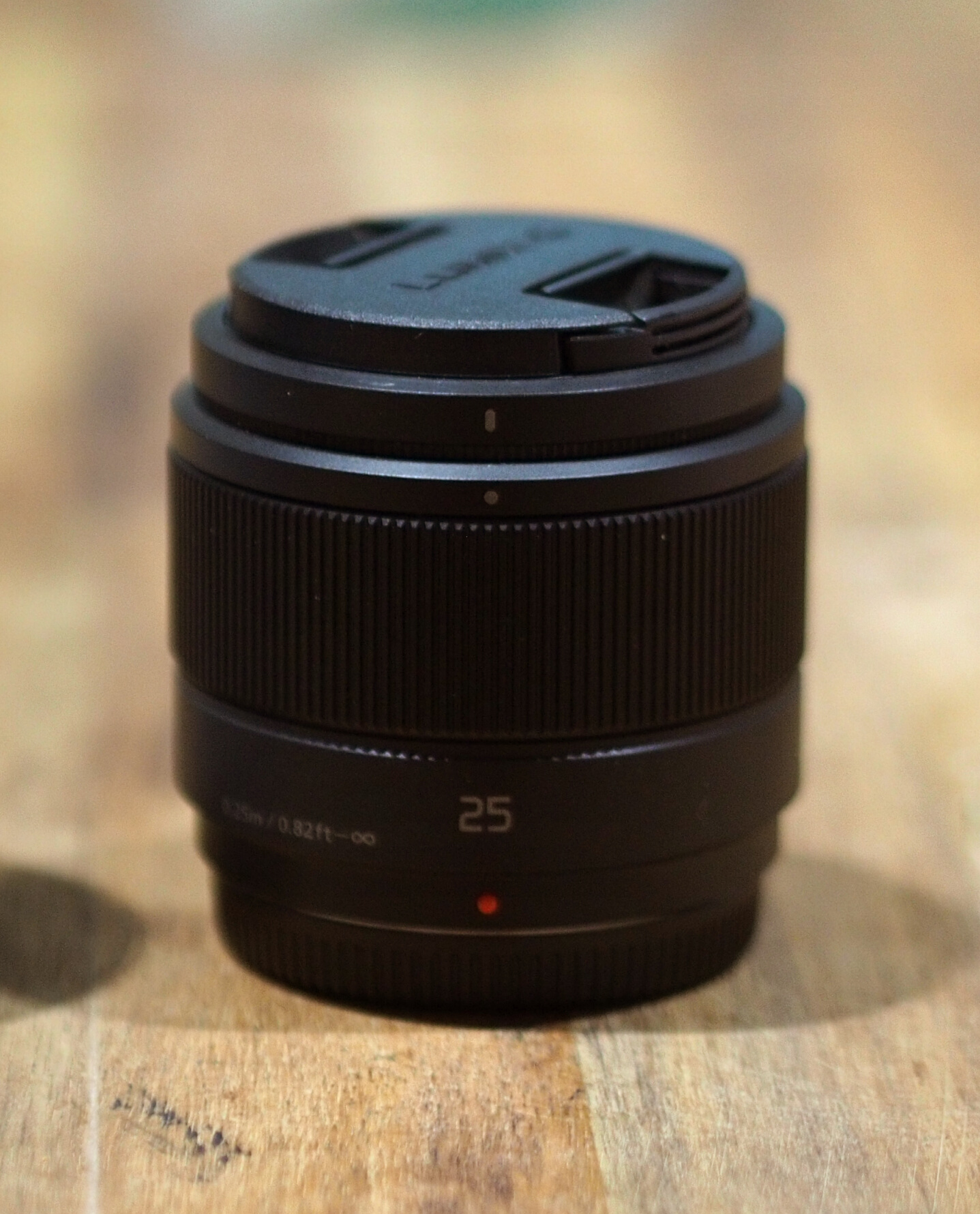
The Panasonic Lumix G 25mm F1.7 ASPH lens with its lens cap on
