= List of retro-style digital cameras =

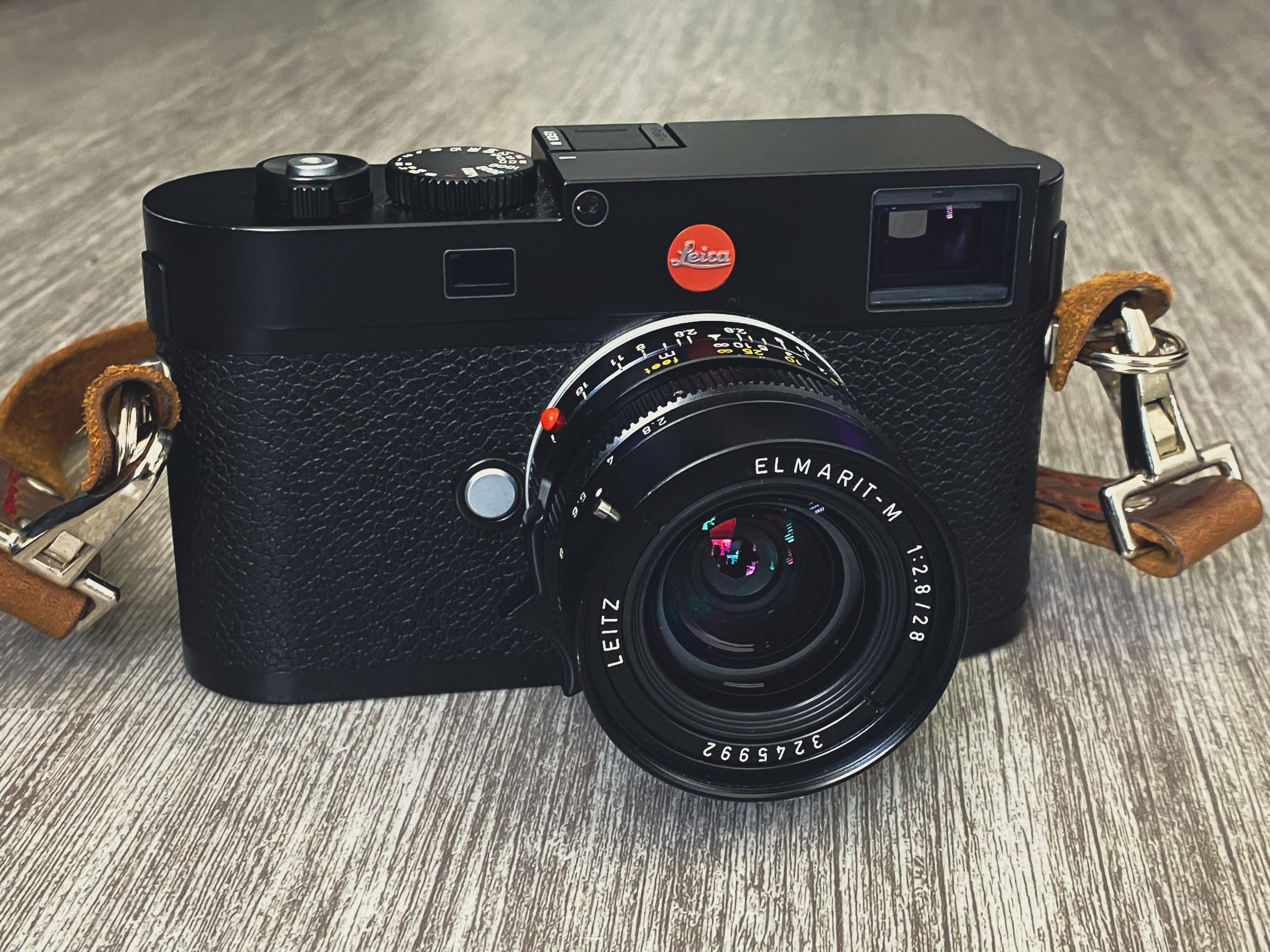
Leica M (Typ 262)

This is a list of retro-style digital cameras, categorized into five body types:

- **modular** cameras with a digital back,
- true **rangefinder** cameras (without autofocus),
- **rangefinder-style** mirrorless cameras,
- digital single-lens reflex cameras (D**SLR**s),
- and **SLR-style** mirrorless cameras.

These cameras are designed to resemble and are often mistaken for vintage film cameras. Models that are currently in production are shown in bold.

Body type	Lens mount	Model series	Metal top	Analog dials	OVF	Sensor size	Release years
**Modular**	Hasselblad XCD	Hasselblad 907X 50C, **907X 100C**	Yes	No	No (Note: Screen can be tilted and used as a waist-level finder. Optical viewfinder is an optional accessory.)	Medium format	2020—2024
**Rangefinder**	Leica M	Leica M9, M, M10, **M11**	Yes	Yes	Yes	Full frame	2009—2023
**Rangefinder**	Leica M	Leica M8	Yes	Yes	Yes	APS-H	2006—2008
**Rangefinder**	Leica M	Epson R-D1	Yes	Yes	Yes	APS-C	2004—2009
**Rangefinder-** **style**	Fixed lens	Fujifilm GFX100RF	Yes	Yes	EVF	Medium format	2025
**Rangefinder-** **style**	Fixed lens	Leica Q, Q2, **Q3**	Yes	Yes	EVF	Full frame	2015—2023
**Rangefinder-** **style**	Fixed lens	Leica X1, X2, X Vario, X	Yes	Yes	EVF	APS-C	2009—2014
**Rangefinder-** **style**	Fixed lens	Fujifilm X100, X100S, X100T, X100F, X100V, **X100VI**	Yes	Yes	Yes (Note: Hybrid viewfinder combines both an optical viewfinder and an electronic viewfinder.)	APS-C	2010—2024
**Rangefinder-** **style**	Fixed lens	Fujifilm X70	Yes	Yes	No	APS-C	2016
**Rangefinder-** **style**	Fixed lens	Leica D-Lux, D-Lux 7, **D-Lux 8**	Yes	Yes	EVF	4/3-type	2014—2024
**Rangefinder-** **style**	Fixed lens	Panasonic LX100, LX100 II	Yes	Yes	EVF	4/3-type	2014—2018
**Rangefinder-** **style**	Fixed lens	Fujifilm X half (X-HF1)	No	Yes	Yes	1.0-type	2025
**Rangefinder-** **style**	Fixed lens	Fujifilm X30	Yes	No	EVF	2/3-type	2014
**Rangefinder-** **style**	Fixed lens	Fujifilm X10, X20	Yes	No	Yes	2/3-type	2011—2013
**Rangefinder-** **style**	Fujifilm G	Fujifilm GFX 50R	Yes	No	EVF	Medium format	2018
**Rangefinder-** **style**	Leica L	Panasonic **S9**	No	No	No	Full frame	2024
**Rangefinder-** **style**	Leica L	Leica CL	Yes	No	EVF	APS-C	2017
**Rangefinder-** **style**	Fujifilm X	Fujifilm X-Pro1, X-Pro2, X-Pro3	Yes	Yes	Yes	APS-C	2012—2019
**Rangefinder-** **style**	Fujifilm X	Fujifilm X-E1, X-E2, X-E3, X-E4	Yes	Yes	EVF	APS-C	2012—2021
**Rangefinder-** **style**	Fujifilm X	Fujifilm X-M1, **X-M5**	No	No	No	APS-C	2013—2024
**Rangefinder-** **style**	Fujifilm X	Fujifilm X-A1, X-A2, X-A3, X-A5, X-A7	No	No	No	APS-C	2013—2019
**Rangefinder-** **style**	Micro Four; Thirds	Olympus PEN-F	Yes	No	EVF	4/3-type	2016
**Rangefinder-** **style**	Micro Four; Thirds	Olympus **PEN E-P7**	No	No	No	4/3-type	2021
**Rangefinder-** **style**	Micro Four; Thirds	Panasonic GX8	No	No	EVF	4/3-type	2015
**Rangefinder-** **style**	Micro Four; Thirds	Panasonic GM5	Yes	No	EVF	4/3-type	2014
**Rangefinder-** **style**	Micro Four; Thirds	Panasonic GM1	Yes	No	No	4/3-type	2013
**SLR**	Nikon F	Nikon Df	Yes	Yes	Yes	Full frame	2013
**SLR-style**	Nikon Z	Nikon **Zf**	Yes	Yes	EVF	Full frame	2023
**SLR-style**	Nikon Z	Nikon **Zfc**	Yes	Yes	EVF	APS-C	2021
**SLR-style**	Fujifilm X	Fujifilm X-T1, X-T2, X-T3, X-T4, **X-T5**	Yes	Yes	EVF	APS-C	2014—2022
**SLR-style**	Fujifilm X	Fujifilm X-T10, X-T20, X-T30, **X-T30 II**, **X-T50**	Yes	Yes	EVF	APS-C	2015—2024
**SLR-style**	Fujifilm X	Fujifilm X-T100, X-T200	No	No	EVF	APS-C	2018—2020
**SLR-style**	Micro Four; Thirds	OM System **OM-3**	Yes	No	EVF	4/3-type	2025
**SLR-style**	Micro Four; Thirds	Olympus E-M5, E-M5 Mark II	Yes	No	EVF	4/3-type	2012—2015
**SLR-style**	Micro Four; Thirds	Olympus E-M5 Mark III, OM System **OM-5**	No	No	EVF	4/3-type	2019—2022
**SLR-style**	Micro Four; Thirds	Olympus E-M10, E-M10 Mark II	Yes	No	EVF	4/3-type	2014—2015
**SLR-style**	Micro Four; Thirds	Olympus E-M10 Mark III, **E-M10 Mark IV**	No	No	EVF	4/3-type	2017—2020
**TLR-style**	Fixed lens	Rolleiflex MiniDigi, MiniDigi AF 5.0	No	No	No	1/2-type	2004, 2008

== See also ==
- List of digital cameras with CCD sensors
- List of large sensor fixed-lens cameras
- List of lightest mirrorless cameras
