= Olympus OM-D E-M10 =

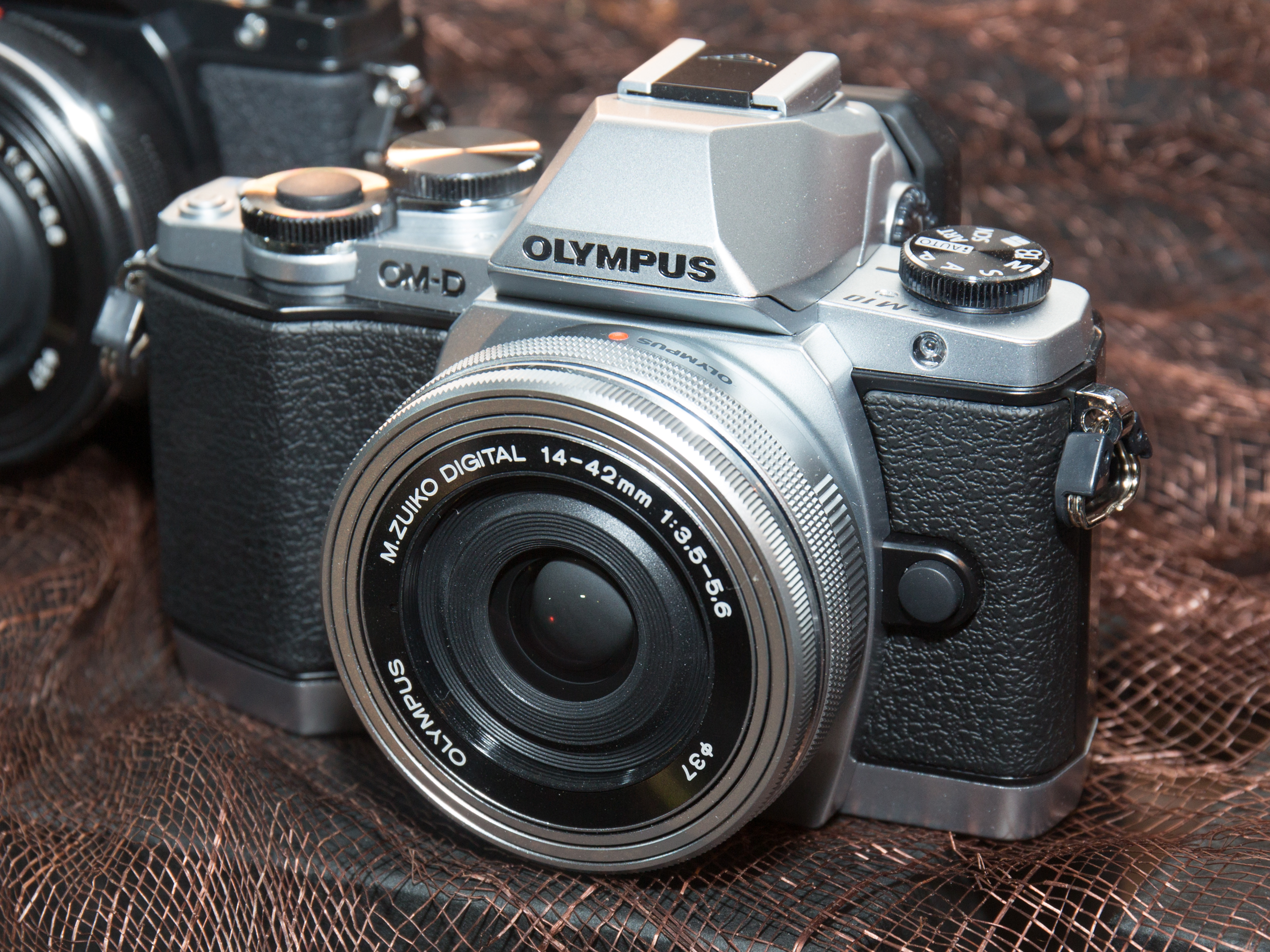

Overview
- Maker: Olympus Corporation
- Type: Micro Four Thirds system

Lens
- Lens: Micro Four Thirds system mount

Sensor/medium
- Sensor: 4/3 type Live MOS, no AA filter
- Sensor size: 17.3 x 13 mm, Four Thirds Live MOS
- Maximum resolution: 4608 x 3456 (16.0 megapixels)
- Storage media: SD /SDHC / SDXC

Focusing
- Focus modes: Contrast Detect (sensor), Face Detect, Multi-area, Center, Selective single-point, Tracking, Single, Continuous, Touch, Face Detection, Live View

Exposure/metering
- Exposure modes: Aperture priority, Shutter, Program AE, Manual (w/ Focus Peaking), iAuto, Bulb, Time, Scene Select, Art Filter
- Metering modes: Multiple, Center-Weighted, Spot

Flash
- Flash: built-in flash, hot-shoe on the body

Shutter
- Shutter: Mechanical shutter / Electronic shutter
- Shutter speed range: 60 - 1/4000 sec.
- Continuous shooting: 8.0 fps

Viewfinder
- Viewfinder: built-in 1.44MP (w/ Auto Luminance, 100% coverage)

Image processing
- White balance: 7 presets, with custom modes

General
- Video recording: H.264 / Motion JPG, 1920 x 1080 (30fps), 1280 x 720 (30fps), 640 x 480 (30fps)
- LCD screen: tilting 3 inch, 1,037,000 dots (upwards: 80˚, downwards: 50˚)
- Battery: BLS-5 lithium-ion (CIPA 320)
- Dimensions: 119 mm × 82 mm × 46 mm (4.69 × 3.24 × 1.81 inches)
- Weight: Approx. 396 g (14.0 oz)

The Olympus OM-D E-M10 is a third model in the OM-D series of compact, mirrorless, interchangeable-lens cameras. It is of the Micro Four Thirds type that was introduced in January 2014.

The model cost less than the OM-D E-M5 and OM-D E-M1 models that preceded it. Some features of the previous models, such as weather sealing, were not included. The E-M10 featured only a 3-way image stabilizer instead of the other models' 5-way stabilizer.

The E-M10 used the BLS-1 battery first supplied with the earlier E-P1/2 compact mirrorless cameras rather than the BLN-1 used by the OM-D E-M5 and E-M1 models.

It was succeeded by the Olympus OM-D E-M10 Mark II in 2015.

== Specification and features ==
- Sensor: 16MP Live MOS sensor without AA filter
- Image stabilisation: 3-axis image stabilisation
- Tilting LCD screen, with capacitive touchscreen operation
- TruePic VII processor with lens correction
- ISO range: 200 - 25600
- Manual focus (with focus peaking)
- Focus points: 81-area multiple AF (Contrast detection AF)
- In-camera HDR
- Flash: built-in flash, hot shoe
- Flash sync: 1/250 sec.
- Built-in wifi: 802.11 b/g/n for remote shooting (smartphone, tablet)
- Customisable buttons: 3 on top + arrow keys
- Ports: SDHC/XC, AV/USB, HDMI connector
- Remote control: optional (RM-UC1 Remote Cable) or via built-in Wifi and Olympus smartphone application
- Optional Grip (ECG-1)
- Art Filters: Pop Art, Soft Focus, Pale & Light Color, Light Tone, Grainy Film, Pin Hole, Diorama, Cross Process, Gentle Sepia, Dramatic Tone, Key Line, Watercolor
- Current Firmware: Version 1.4 (December 2018)

== See also ==
- List of retro-style digital cameras

Brand	Form	Class	2008	2009	2010	2011			2012	2013	2014	2015	2016	2017	2018	2019	2020	2021	2022	2023	2024	2025
Olympus	SLR style OM-D	Professional															E-M1X ^{R}					
Olympus	SLR style OM-D	High-end									E-M1			E-M1 II ^{R}			E-M1 III ^{R}					
Olympus	SLR style OM-D	Advanced							E-M5			E-M5 II ^{R}					E-M5 III ^{R}					
Olympus	SLR style OM-D	Mid-range									E-M10		E-M10 II		E-M10 III			E-M10 IV				
Olympus	Rangefinder style PEN	Mid-range		E-P1	E-P2		E-P3				E-P5		PEN-F ^{R}									
Olympus	Rangefinder style PEN	Upper-entry			E-PL1	E-PL2		E-PL3	E-PL5		E-PL6	E-PL7		E-PL8	E-PL9		E-PL10					
Olympus	Rangefinder style PEN	Entry-level					E-PM1		E-PM2													
Olympus	remote													Air								
OM System	SLR style	Professional																	OM-1 ^{R}		OM-1 II ^{R}	
OM System	SLR style	High-end																				OM-3 ^{R}
OM System	SLR style	Advanced																		OM-5 ^{R}		OM-5 II ^{R}
OM System	PEN	Mid-range																	E-P7			
Panasonic	SLR style	High-end Video													GH5S				GH6 ^{R}			GH7 ^{R}
Panasonic	SLR style	High-end Photo													G9 ^{R}						G9 II ^{R}	
Panasonic	SLR style	High-end		GH1		GH2			GH3		GH4				GH5				GH5II			
Panasonic	SLR style	Mid-range		G1	G2		G3		G5		G6		G7	G80/G85			G90/G95					
Panasonic	SLR style	Entry-level			G10													G100			G100D	
Panasonic	Rangefinder style	Advanced							GX1		GX7		GX8		GX9							
Panasonic	Rangefinder style	Mid-range									GM1	GM5	GX80/GX85									
Panasonic	Rangefinder style	Entry-level			GF1	GF2	GF3		GF5		GF6	GF7	GF8	GX800/GX850/GF9		GX880/GF10/GF90						
Panasonic	Camcorder	Professional							AG-AF104													
Kodak	Rangefinder style	Entry-level										S-1										
DJI	Drone	.												Zenmuse X5S								
DJI	Drone	.												Zenmuse X5								
YI	Rangefinder style	Entry-level												M1								
Yongnuo	Rangefinder style	Android camera															YN450M		YN455			
Blackmagic Design	Rangefinder style	High-End Video							Cinema Camera													
Blackmagic Design	Rangefinder style	High-End Video									Pocket Cinema Camera					Pocket Cinema Camera 4K						
Blackmagic Design		High-End Video										Micro Cinema Camera									Micro Studio Camera 4K G2	
Z CAM	Cinema	Advanced											E1			E2						
Z CAM	Cinema	Mid-Range																E2-M4				
Z CAM	Cinema	Entry-Level															E2C					
JVC	Camcorder	Professional										GY-LS300										
SVS-Vistek		Industrial							EVO Tracer													
