= Olympus OM-D E-M5 Mark III =

Digital mirrorless camera

Olympus OM-D E-M5 III
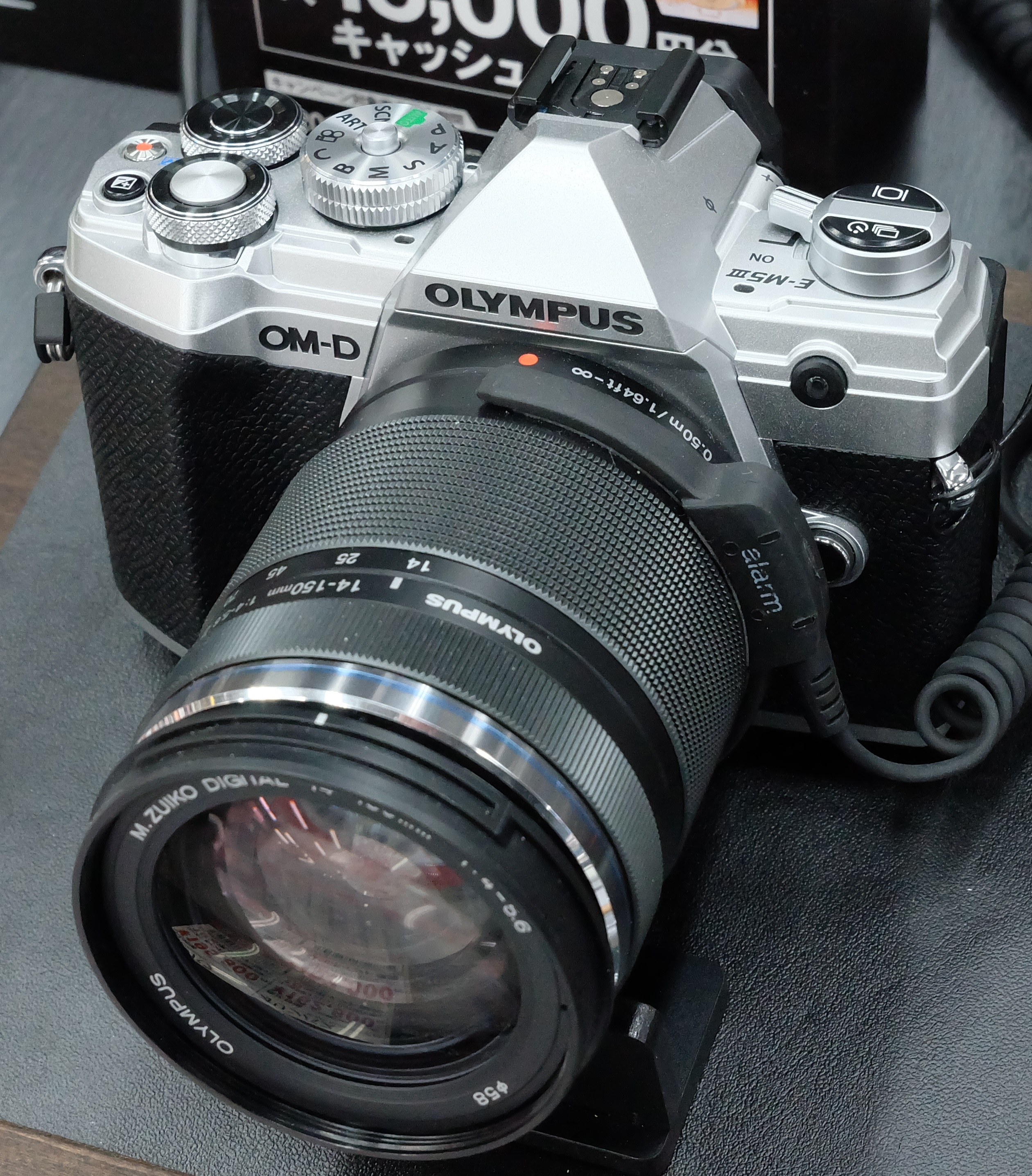

Overview
- Maker: Olympus
- Released: November 15, 2019
- Intro price: $1,199.99 (body only) $1,799.99 (with Olympus 14-150mm F4-5.6 II lens)

Sensor/medium
- Sensor type: CMOS
- Sensor size: 17.3 x 13mm (Four Thirds type)
- Maximum resolution: 5184 × 3888; High Res Shot: JPEG: 8160 × 6120 / 5760 × 4320 RAW: 10368 × 7776
- Recording medium: SD, SDHC or SDXC card

Focusing
- Focus areas: 121 focus points

Shutter
- Shutter speeds: 1/8000s to 60s (1/32,000 with electronic shutter)
- Continuous shooting: 10 frames per second (30 fps with electronic shutter)

Viewfinder
- Electronic viewfinder: OLED with 2.36 million dots
- Viewfinder magnification: 1.37
- Frame coverage: 100%

Image processing
- Image processor: TruePic VIII
- White balance: Yes

General
- Dimensions: 125.3×85.2×49.7 mm (4.93×3.35×1.96 in)
- Weight: 366 g (13 oz) body only

The Olympus OM-D E-M5 Mark III is the third iteration of the enthusiast-level mirrorless interchangeable-lens camera produced by Olympus on the Micro Four-Thirds system. The camera is the successor to the Olympus OM-D E-M5 Mark II and was released on November 15, 2019.

The E-M5 Mark III boasts the multi-shot high resolution mode introduced in the E-M5 Mark II, allowing the 20 MP sensor to produce 50 MP JPEG images or 80 MP raw images while on tripod. As with most Olympus Micro Four-Thirds cameras, the E-M5 Mark III includes 5-axis image stabilization in the camera body, allowing lenses without image stabilization to be fitted to the camera. The E-M5 Mark III is capable of 4K video at 30 and 24 frames per second.

== Features ==
- 20 Megapixel Micro Four-Thirds sensor
- 121 point autofocus
- 50 Megapixel high resolution multi-shot mode for JPEG images
- 80 Megapixel high resolution multi-shot mode for raw images
- 2.36 million dot OLED electronic viewfinder
- Weather-sealed body
- Articulated touchscreen

== Reception ==
The E-M5 Mark III received positive reviews upon release, lauding its small size in comparison to equivalent DSLR cameras and the professional-level E-M1 that includes many of the same features as the E-M5 Mark III. Reviewers criticized the E-M5 Mark III for its short battery life and lightweight feel due to its plastic exterior, a change from previous iterations of the OM-D series. However, the plastic casing allowed the camera to achieve the lightest weight and smallest size of any Olympus 20MP camera of its time.

== See also ==
- List of retro-style digital cameras

Brand	Form	Class	2008	2009	2010	2011			2012	2013	2014	2015	2016	2017	2018	2019	2020	2021	2022	2023	2024	25
Olympus	SLR style OM-D	Professional															E-M1X ^{R}					
Olympus	SLR style OM-D	High-end									E-M1			E-M1 II ^{R}			E-M1 III ^{R}					
Olympus	SLR style OM-D	Advanced							E-M5			E-M5 II ^{R}					E-M5 III ^{R}					
Olympus	SLR style OM-D	Mid-range									E-M10		E-M10 II		E-M10 III			E-M10 IV				
Olympus	Rangefinder style PEN	Mid-range		E-P1	E-P2		E-P3				E-P5		PEN-F ^{R}									
Olympus	Rangefinder style PEN	Upper-entry			E-PL1	E-PL2		E-PL3	E-PL5		E-PL6	E-PL7		E-PL8	E-PL9		E-PL10					
Olympus	Rangefinder style PEN	Entry-level					E-PM1		E-PM2													
Olympus	remote													Air								
OM System	SLR style	Professional																	OM-1 ^{R}		OM-1 II ^{R}	
OM System	SLR style	High-end																				OM-3 ^{R}
OM System	SLR style	Advanced																		OM-5 ^{R}		
OM System	PEN	Mid-range																	E-P7			
Panasonic	SLR style	High-end Video													GH5S				GH6 ^{R}			GH7 ^{R}
Panasonic	SLR style	High-end Photo													G9 ^{R}						G9 II ^{R}	
Panasonic	SLR style	High-end		GH1		GH2			GH3		GH4				GH5				GH5II			
Panasonic	SLR style	Mid-range		G1	G2		G3		G5		G6		G7	G80/G85			G90/G95					
Panasonic	SLR style	Entry-level			G10													G100			G100D	
Panasonic	Rangefinder style	Advanced							GX1		GX7		GX8		GX9							
Panasonic	Rangefinder style	Mid-range									GM1	GM5	GX80/GX85									
Panasonic	Rangefinder style	Entry-level			GF1	GF2	GF3		GF5		GF6	GF7	GF8	GX800/GX850/GF9		GX880/GF10/GF90						
Panasonic	Camcorder	Professional							AG-AF104													
Kodak	Rangefinder style	Entry-level										S-1										
DJI	Drone	.												Zenmuse X5S								
DJI	Drone	.												Zenmuse X5								
YI	Rangefinder style	Entry-level												M1								
Yongnuo	Rangefinder style	Android camera															YN450M		YN455			
Blackmagic Design	Rangefinder style	High-End Video							Cinema Camera													
Blackmagic Design	Rangefinder style	High-End Video									Pocket Cinema Camera					Pocket Cinema Camera 4K						
Blackmagic Design		High-End Video										Micro Cinema Camera									Micro Studio Camera 4K G2	
Z CAM	Cinema	Advanced											E1			E2						
Z CAM	Cinema	Mid-Range																E2-M4				
Z CAM	Cinema	Entry-Level															E2C					
JVC	Camcorder	Professional										GY-LS300										
SVS-Vistek		Industrial							EVO Tracer													
