= Olympus OM-D E-M5 =

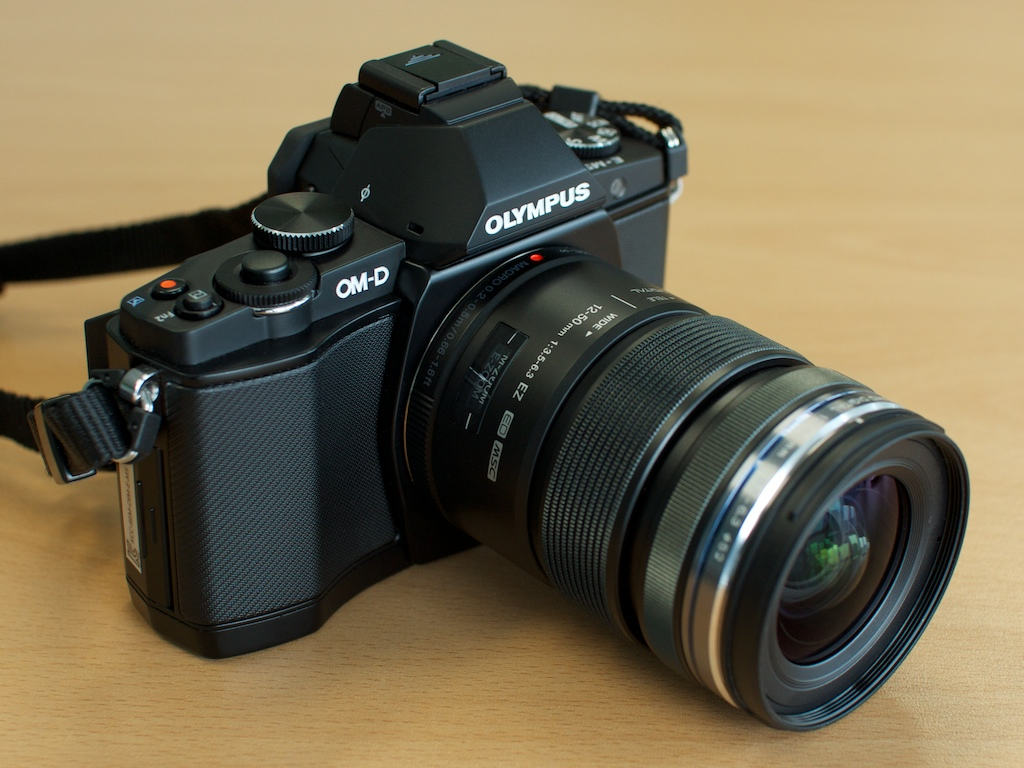

Overview
- Maker: Olympus Corporation
- Type: Micro Four Thirds System

Lens
- Lens: Micro Four Thirds System mount

Sensor/medium
- Sensor: Four Thirds System 16MP Live MOS
- Film speed: ISO 200–12800, extendable to 125-25600
- Storage media: SD, SDHC, SDXC

Focusing
- Focus modes: Automatic or Manual
- Focus areas: 35 area selectable auto-focus

Exposure/metering
- Exposure modes: Manual, Program, Shutter Priority, Aperture Priority, User settings
- Exposure metering: Intelligent Multiple

Flash
- Flash: Detachable and can trigger remote flash
- Flash synchronization: up to 1/250s

Viewfinder
- Viewfinder: 1.44 million dot Epson Ultimicron LCD

Image processing
- White balance: Auto / Color temperature setting / Manual measurement

General
- LCD screen: VGA-equivalent 3in OLED touchscreen tilts upwards and downwards with live preview
- Battery: Li-ion Battery Pack
- Dimensions: 4.8 in × 3.5 in × 1.69 in (122 mm × 89 mm × 43 mm)
- Weight: 14.99 oz (425 g) with battery

The Olympus OM-D E-M5, announced in February 2012, is a Micro Four Thirds compact mirrorless interchangeable lens camera. In style and name it references the Olympus OM series of film SLR cameras, but it is not an SLR camera (there is no optical path from lens to viewfinder: a high quality electronic viewfinder is used). The successor is the Olympus OM-D E-M5 Mark II.

== Awards ==
In April 2012, the enthusiast photography web site Digital Photography Review (DP Review) awarded the OM-D EM-5 a Gold Award. On the same website it was subsequently voted Best Camera of 2012 in a photographers' poll.

Other photography news and reviews websites that awarded the OM-D EM-5 "Camera of the Year" for 2012 were photographyblog.com and wirefresh. The camera also won a 2012 Pop Photo award from the magazine Popular Photography.

== Features ==
- Magnesium alloy body with extensive weather sealing
- Up to ISO 25,600
- 16 MP Four Thirds sensor, with substantially lower noise than the earlier 12 MP sensor
- HD video capture, including 1080i at 30 fps and 720p at 60 fps
- No built-in flash (a small shoe mounted flash is included, which can act as a wireless commander for E-system flashes which support wireless mode)
- TruePic VI processor
- 5-axis in-body image stabilisation
- Up to nine frames per second continuous shooting
- Very fast contrast detect auto focus
- "Live Bulb" (without toggle) and "Live Time" (with toggle) bulb mode settings, where the viewfinder and display get updated 'during' the exposure in order to allow the photographer to inspect the exposure while it "develops". The display refresh rate for this mode can be configured between 0.5 s and 60 s.
- Tilting 800 x 600 LCD OLED touchscreen, allowing shooting from awkward angles and with the ability to select the focus point and release the shutter with a touch

== See also ==
- List of retro-style digital cameras

Brand	Form	Class	2008	2009	2010	2011			2012	2013	2014	2015	2016	2017	2018	2019	2020	2021	2022	2023	2024	2025	2026
Olympus	SLR style OM-D	Professional															E-M1X ^{R}						
Olympus	SLR style OM-D	High-end									E-M1			E-M1 II ^{R}			E-M1 III ^{R}						
Olympus	SLR style OM-D	Advanced							E-M5			E-M5 II ^{R}					E-M5 III ^{R}						
Olympus	SLR style OM-D	Mid-range									E-M10		E-M10 II		E-M10 III			E-M10 IV					
Olympus	Rangefinder style PEN	Mid-range		E-P1	E-P2		E-P3				E-P5		PEN-F ^{R}										
Olympus	Rangefinder style PEN	Upper-entry			E-PL1	E-PL2		E-PL3	E-PL5		E-PL6	E-PL7		E-PL8	E-PL9		E-PL10						
Olympus	Rangefinder style PEN	Entry-level					E-PM1		E-PM2														
Olympus	remote													Air									
OM System	SLR style	Professional																	OM-1 ^{R}		OM-1 II ^{R}		
OM System	SLR style	High-end																				OM-3 ^{R}	
OM System	SLR style	Advanced																		OM-5 ^{R}			OM-5 II ^{R}
OM System	PEN	Mid-range																	E-P7				
Panasonic	SLR style	High-end Video													GH5S				GH6 ^{R}			GH7 ^{R}	
Panasonic	SLR style	High-end Photo													G9 ^{R}						G9 II ^{R}		
Panasonic	SLR style	High-end		GH1		GH2			GH3		GH4				GH5				GH5II				
Panasonic	SLR style	Mid-range		G1	G2		G3		G5		G6		G7	G80/G85			G90/G95						
Panasonic	SLR style	Entry-level			G10													G100			G100D		
Panasonic	Rangefinder style	Advanced							GX1		GX7		GX8		GX9								
Panasonic	Rangefinder style	Mid-range									GM1	GM5	GX80/GX85										
Panasonic	Rangefinder style	Entry-level			GF1	GF2	GF3		GF5		GF6	GF7	GF8	GX800/GX850/GF9		GX880/GF10/GF90							
Panasonic	Camcorder	Professional							AG-AF104														
Kodak	Rangefinder style	Entry-level										S-1											
DJI	Drone	.												Zenmuse X5S									
DJI	Drone	.												Zenmuse X5									
YI	Rangefinder style	Entry-level												M1									
Yongnuo	Rangefinder style	Android camera															YN450M		YN455				
Blackmagic Design	Rangefinder style	High-End Video							Cinema Camera														
Blackmagic Design	Rangefinder style	High-End Video									Pocket Cinema Camera					Pocket Cinema Camera 4K							
Blackmagic Design		High-End Video										Micro Cinema Camera									Micro Studio Camera 4K G2		
Z CAM	Cinema	Advanced											E1			E2							
Z CAM	Cinema	Mid-Range																E2-M4					
Z CAM	Cinema	Entry-Level															E2C						
JVC	Camcorder	Professional										GY-LS300											
SVS-Vistek		Industrial							EVO Tracer														
