= Olympus OM-D E-M10 Mark IV =

Digital mirrorless camera

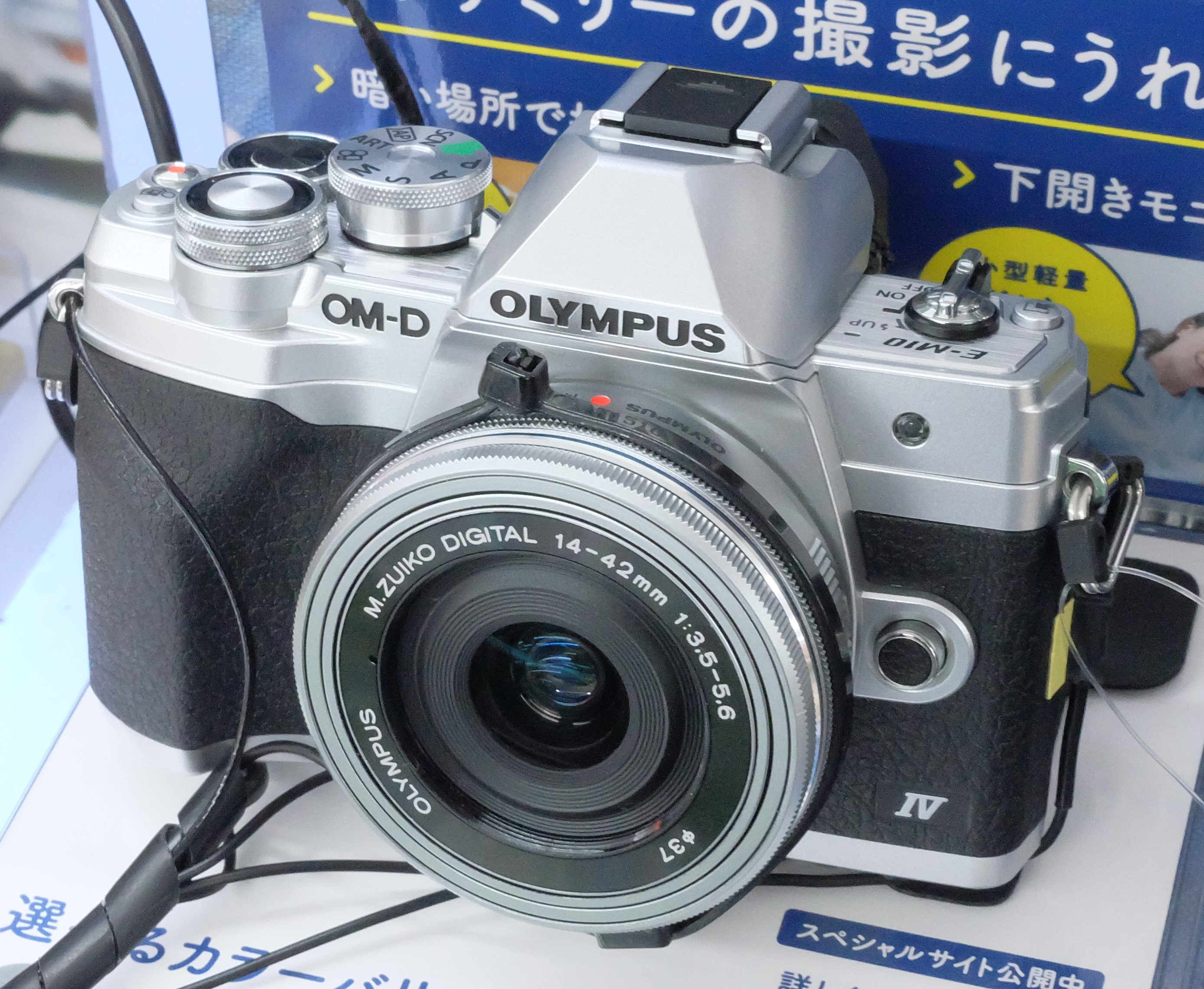

Overview
- Maker: Olympus Corporation; OM Digital Solutions
- Type: Micro Four Thirds system
- Intro price: $699 (body only), $799 (with 14-42mm F3.5-5.6 EZ lens)

Lens
- Lens: Interchangeable, Micro Four Thirds mount

Sensor/medium
- Sensor: 20.3 Megapixel
- Sensor type: Live MOS
- Sensor size: 17.4 x 13.0mm (Micro Four-Thirds)

Flash
- Flash: built-in flash, hot-shoe on the body

General
- LCD screen: 3.0" 180º tilting touch-screen monitor
- Dimensions: 121.7×84.4×49 mm (4.79×3.32×1.93 in)
- Weight: 335 g (12 oz) (body only)
- Made in: Vietnam

Chronology
- Predecessor: Olympus OM-D E-M10 Mark III

The Olympus OM-D E-M10 Mark IV is the fourth iteration of the entry-level model in the OM-D series of mirrorless interchangeable-lens cameras produced by Olympus (since 2021 OM Digital Solutions). The camera utilizes the micro four-thirds system and was announced on August 4, 2020, and launched on September 18 of the same year.

It is the first OM-D camera to feature a flip-down LCD monitor, and the first E-M10 model to include a 20 Megapixel live MOS sensor. It includes in-body image stabilization.

== Features ==
- 20 Megapixel Live MOS sensor (Four Thirds)
- TruePic VIII processor
- 5-axis in-body image stabilization (up to 4.5 stops)
- 121-point contrast-detect AF system
- Flip-down touchscreen display
- Electronic viewfinder
- 4.5 fps burst shooting w/AF
- USB charging
- Wi-Fi + Bluetooth
- 360 shots per charge (with LCD)

== Reception ==
Reviews of the E-M10 Mark IV were generally positive, though the camera took some criticism for having a plastic build that differed from the previous iterations that were of metal construction.

== See also ==
- List of retro-style digital cameras

Brand	Form	Class	2008	2009	2010	2011			2012	2013	2014	2015	2016	2017	2018	2019	2020	2021	2022	2023	2024	2025	2026
Olympus	SLR style OM-D	Professional															E-M1X ^{R}						
Olympus	SLR style OM-D	High-end									E-M1			E-M1 II ^{R}			E-M1 III ^{R}						
Olympus	SLR style OM-D	Advanced							E-M5			E-M5 II ^{R}					E-M5 III ^{R}						
Olympus	SLR style OM-D	Mid-range									E-M10		E-M10 II		E-M10 III			E-M10 IV					
Olympus	Rangefinder style PEN	Mid-range		E-P1	E-P2		E-P3				E-P5		PEN-F ^{R}										
Olympus	Rangefinder style PEN	Upper-entry			E-PL1	E-PL2		E-PL3	E-PL5		E-PL6	E-PL7		E-PL8	E-PL9		E-PL10						
Olympus	Rangefinder style PEN	Entry-level					E-PM1		E-PM2														
Olympus	remote													Air									
OM System	SLR style	Professional																	OM-1 ^{R}		OM-1 II ^{R}		
OM System	SLR style	High-end																				OM-3 ^{R}	
OM System	SLR style	Advanced																		OM-5 ^{R}			OM-5 II ^{R}
OM System	PEN	Mid-range																	E-P7				
Panasonic	SLR style	High-end Video													GH5S				GH6 ^{R}			GH7 ^{R}	
Panasonic	SLR style	High-end Photo													G9 ^{R}						G9 II ^{R}		
Panasonic	SLR style	High-end		GH1		GH2			GH3		GH4				GH5				GH5II				
Panasonic	SLR style	Mid-range		G1	G2		G3		G5		G6		G7	G80/G85			G90/G95						
Panasonic	SLR style	Entry-level			G10													G100			G100D		
Panasonic	Rangefinder style	Advanced							GX1		GX7		GX8		GX9								
Panasonic	Rangefinder style	Mid-range									GM1	GM5	GX80/GX85										
Panasonic	Rangefinder style	Entry-level			GF1	GF2	GF3		GF5		GF6	GF7	GF8	GX800/GX850/GF9		GX880/GF10/GF90							
Panasonic	Camcorder	Professional							AG-AF104														
Kodak	Rangefinder style	Entry-level										S-1											
DJI	Drone	.												Zenmuse X5S									
DJI	Drone	.												Zenmuse X5									
YI	Rangefinder style	Entry-level												M1									
Yongnuo	Rangefinder style	Android camera															YN450M		YN455				
Blackmagic Design	Rangefinder style	High-End Video							Cinema Camera														
Blackmagic Design	Rangefinder style	High-End Video									Pocket Cinema Camera					Pocket Cinema Camera 4K							
Blackmagic Design		High-End Video										Micro Cinema Camera									Micro Studio Camera 4K G2		
Z CAM	Cinema	Advanced											E1			E2							
Z CAM	Cinema	Mid-Range																E2-M4					
Z CAM	Cinema	Entry-Level															E2C						
JVC	Camcorder	Professional										GY-LS300											
SVS-Vistek		Industrial							EVO Tracer														
