= Olympus OM-D E-M10 Mark II =

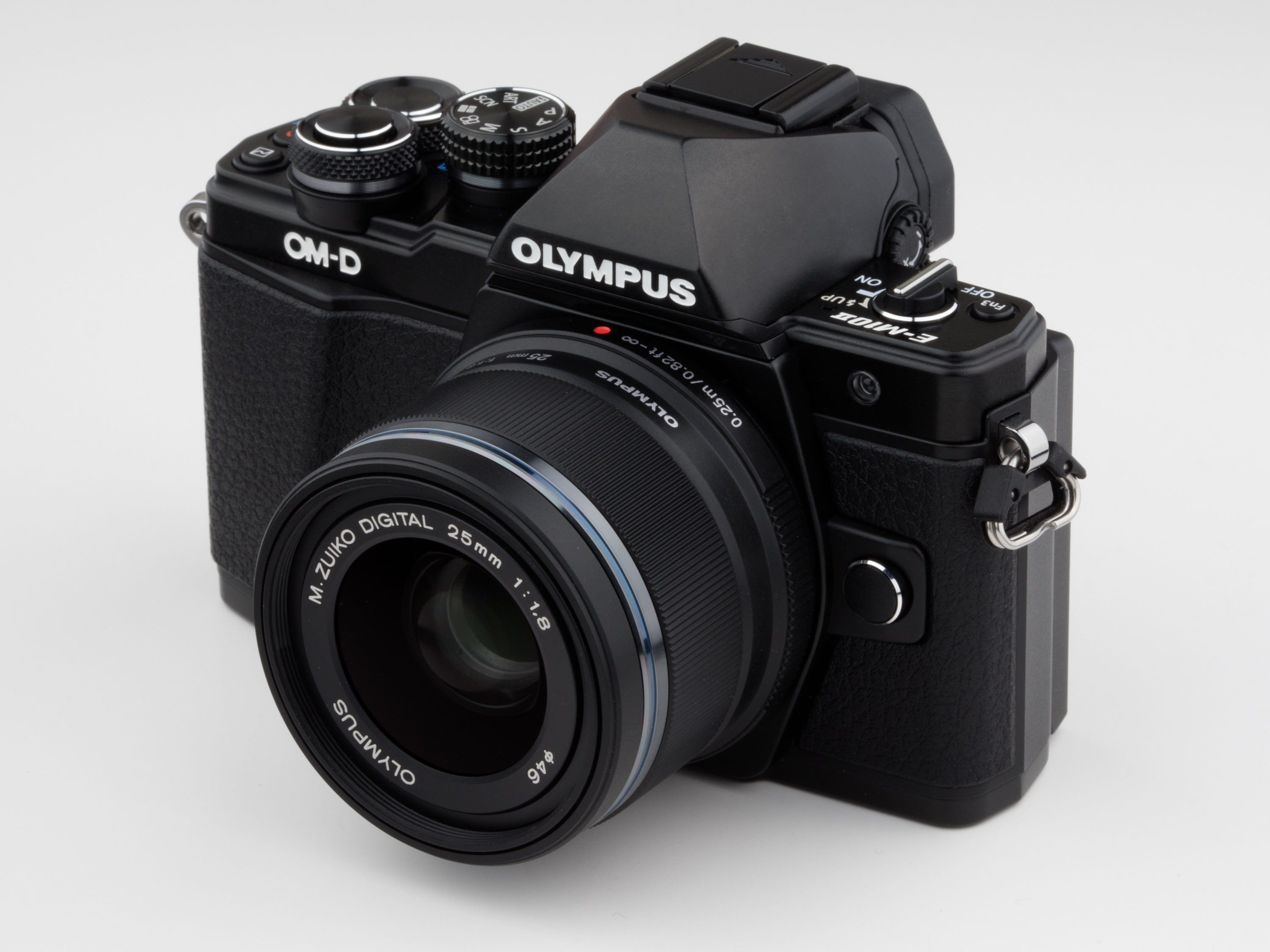

Overview
- Maker: Olympus
- Type: Mirrorless Interchangeable Lens Camera

Lens
- Lens mount: Micro Four Thirds

Sensor/medium
- Sensor type: Live MOS
- Sensor size: 17.3 x 13mm (Four Thirds type)
- Maximum resolution: 4608 x 3456 (16 megapixels)
- Film speed: 100-25600
- Recording medium: SD, SDHC or SDXC memory card

Focusing
- Focus areas: 81 focus points

Exposure/metering
- Exposure metering: TTL

Shutter
- Shutter speeds: 1/16000s to 60s
- Continuous shooting: 8 frames per second

Viewfinder
- Viewfinder magnification: 1.23 (0.68x 35mm equvivalent)
- Frame coverage: 100%

Image processing
- Image processor: TruePic VII
- White balance: Yes

General
- LCD screen: 3 inches with 1,040,000 dots
- Dimensions: 120 x 83 x 47mm (4.72 x 3.27 x 1.85 inches)
- Weight: 390 g (14 oz) including battery

Chronology
- Predecessor: Olympus OM-D E-M10
- Successor: Olympus OM-D E-M10 Mark III

The Olympus OM-D E-M10 Mark II is a digital mirrorless system camera announced by Olympus Corporation on August 25, 2015.

The E-M10 Mark II features a 5-axis in-body image stabilization system, an upgrade to the 3-axis design found in its predecessor, the original E-M10.

The E-M10 Mark II was succeeded by the E-M10 Mark III, offering 4K video capabilities.

== Features ==
- 16 megapixel Live MOS 4/3 size sensor
- Micro Four Thirds system
- SLR-style body
- 2.3m dot electronic viewfinder
- 8 fps burst rate
- 1/4000s fastest shutter speed with mechanical shutter
- 1/16000s fastest shutter speed with electronic shutter
- 81 contrast detection autofocus points, no phase detection
- 1080p/60 fps video with 77 Mbit/s bitrate
- Built-in flash
- Wi-Fi
- Tilting touchscreen with a resolution of 1,040 million dots
- 390g body weight

== Drawbacks ==
- No minijack socket (impossible to connect an external microphone)

== Differences with the Olympus OM-D E-M10 ==
- 5 axis sensor stabilization system, instead of a 3 axis.
- Larger resolution viewfinder (2.3m dots instead of 1.4m)
- AF Targeting Pad (select the autofocus point on the touchscreen while composing with the viewfinder)
- Electronic shutter (1/16000s fastest shutter speed)
- UHS-II support
- 4K time lapse (shoot up to 999 frames with 5 fps)
- Improved ergonomics

== See also ==
- List of retro-style digital cameras

Brand	Form	Class	2008	2009	2010	2011			2012	2013	2014	2015	2016	2017	2018	2019	2020	2021	2022	2023	2024	2025	2026
Olympus	SLR style OM-D	Professional															E-M1X ^{R}						
Olympus	SLR style OM-D	High-end									E-M1			E-M1 II ^{R}			E-M1 III ^{R}						
Olympus	SLR style OM-D	Advanced							E-M5			E-M5 II ^{R}					E-M5 III ^{R}						
Olympus	SLR style OM-D	Mid-range									E-M10		E-M10 II		E-M10 III			E-M10 IV					
Olympus	Rangefinder style PEN	Mid-range		E-P1	E-P2		E-P3				E-P5		PEN-F ^{R}										
Olympus	Rangefinder style PEN	Upper-entry			E-PL1	E-PL2		E-PL3	E-PL5		E-PL6	E-PL7		E-PL8	E-PL9		E-PL10						
Olympus	Rangefinder style PEN	Entry-level					E-PM1		E-PM2														
Olympus	remote													Air									
OM System	SLR style	Professional																	OM-1 ^{R}		OM-1 II ^{R}		
OM System	SLR style	High-end																				OM-3 ^{R}	
OM System	SLR style	Advanced																		OM-5 ^{R}			OM-5 II ^{R}
OM System	PEN	Mid-range																	E-P7				
Panasonic	SLR style	High-end Video													GH5S				GH6 ^{R}			GH7 ^{R}	
Panasonic	SLR style	High-end Photo													G9 ^{R}						G9 II ^{R}		
Panasonic	SLR style	High-end		GH1		GH2			GH3		GH4				GH5				GH5II				
Panasonic	SLR style	Mid-range		G1	G2		G3		G5		G6		G7	G80/G85			G90/G95						
Panasonic	SLR style	Entry-level			G10													G100			G100D		
Panasonic	Rangefinder style	Advanced							GX1		GX7		GX8		GX9								
Panasonic	Rangefinder style	Mid-range									GM1	GM5	GX80/GX85										
Panasonic	Rangefinder style	Entry-level			GF1	GF2	GF3		GF5		GF6	GF7	GF8	GX800/GX850/GF9		GX880/GF10/GF90							
Panasonic	Camcorder	Professional							AG-AF104														
Kodak	Rangefinder style	Entry-level										S-1											
DJI	Drone	.												Zenmuse X5S									
DJI	Drone	.												Zenmuse X5									
YI	Rangefinder style	Entry-level												M1									
Yongnuo	Rangefinder style	Android camera															YN450M		YN455				
Blackmagic Design	Rangefinder style	High-End Video							Cinema Camera														
Blackmagic Design	Rangefinder style	High-End Video									Pocket Cinema Camera					Pocket Cinema Camera 4K							
Blackmagic Design		High-End Video										Micro Cinema Camera									Micro Studio Camera 4K G2		
Z CAM	Cinema	Advanced											E1			E2							
Z CAM	Cinema	Mid-Range																E2-M4					
Z CAM	Cinema	Entry-Level															E2C						
JVC	Camcorder	Professional										GY-LS300											
SVS-Vistek		Industrial							EVO Tracer														
