= Olympus OM-D E-M5 Mark II =

Mirrorless digital camera released 2015

Olympus OM-D E-M5 II
- E-M5 Mk II with a 14-150mm f/4-5.6 II kit lens

Overview
- Maker: Olympus

Sensor/medium
- Sensor type: CMOS
- Sensor size: 17.3 x 13mm (Four Thirds type)
- Maximum resolution: 4608 x 3456 (16 megapixels)
- Recording medium: SD, SDHC or SDXC card

Focusing
- Focus areas: 81 focus points

Shutter
- Shutter speeds: 1/8000s to 60s (1/16,000 with e-shutter)
- Continuous shooting: 10 frames per second

Viewfinder
- Viewfinder magnification: 1.48
- Frame coverage: 100%

Image processing
- Image processor: TruePic VII
- White balance: Yes

General
- LCD screen: 3 inches with 1,037,000 dots
- Dimensions: 124 x 85 x 45mm (4.88 x 3.35 x 1.77 inches)
- Weight: 469 g (17 oz) including battery

The Olympus OM-D E-M5 Mark II is a digital interchangeable-lens camera announced in February 2015. It features a new 40-megapixel high-resolution mode that uses sensor shift to generate overlapping 16-megapixel images to then compute a 40-megapixel composite. It is the successor of the Olympus OM-D E-M5. Compared to that earlier model from 2012 and flagship OM-D E-M1 released in 2013, both of which are claimed to have 4 f-stops of shake compensation when shooting handheld, Olympus claims the OM-D E-M5 II can compensate 5 f-stops.

== New significant features ==
- Improved five-axis stabilization which can compensate shaking in handheld shot by 5 stops
- FullHD video recording at 24p, 25p, 30p, 50p, and 60p with up to 77-Mbit/s bitrates
- can take 64MP RAW (40MP JPEG) files by moving the sensor between each shot and merging eight single exposures taken over the course of 1 second into one image
- dust-and-splash-proof magnesium-alloy body

== See also ==
- List of retro-style digital cameras

Brand	Form	Class	2008	2009	2010	2011			2012	2013	2014	2015	2016	2017	2018	2019	2020	2021	2022	2023	2024	2025	2026
Olympus	SLR style OM-D	Professional															E-M1X ^{R}						
Olympus	SLR style OM-D	High-end									E-M1			E-M1 II ^{R}			E-M1 III ^{R}						
Olympus	SLR style OM-D	Advanced							E-M5			E-M5 II ^{R}					E-M5 III ^{R}						
Olympus	SLR style OM-D	Mid-range									E-M10		E-M10 II		E-M10 III			E-M10 IV					
Olympus	Rangefinder style PEN	Mid-range		E-P1	E-P2		E-P3				E-P5		PEN-F ^{R}										
Olympus	Rangefinder style PEN	Upper-entry			E-PL1	E-PL2		E-PL3	E-PL5		E-PL6	E-PL7		E-PL8	E-PL9		E-PL10						
Olympus	Rangefinder style PEN	Entry-level					E-PM1		E-PM2														
Olympus	remote													Air									
OM System	SLR style	Professional																	OM-1 ^{R}		OM-1 II ^{R}		
OM System	SLR style	High-end																				OM-3 ^{R}	
OM System	SLR style	Advanced																		OM-5 ^{R}			OM-5 II ^{R}
OM System	PEN	Mid-range																	E-P7				
Panasonic	SLR style	High-end Video													GH5S				GH6 ^{R}			GH7 ^{R}	
Panasonic	SLR style	High-end Photo													G9 ^{R}						G9 II ^{R}		
Panasonic	SLR style	High-end		GH1		GH2			GH3		GH4				GH5				GH5II				
Panasonic	SLR style	Mid-range		G1	G2		G3		G5		G6		G7	G80/G85			G90/G95						
Panasonic	SLR style	Entry-level			G10													G100			G100D		
Panasonic	Rangefinder style	Advanced							GX1		GX7		GX8		GX9								
Panasonic	Rangefinder style	Mid-range									GM1	GM5	GX80/GX85										
Panasonic	Rangefinder style	Entry-level			GF1	GF2	GF3		GF5		GF6	GF7	GF8	GX800/GX850/GF9		GX880/GF10/GF90							
Panasonic	Camcorder	Professional							AG-AF104														
Kodak	Rangefinder style	Entry-level										S-1											
DJI	Drone	.												Zenmuse X5S									
DJI	Drone	.												Zenmuse X5									
YI	Rangefinder style	Entry-level												M1									
Yongnuo	Rangefinder style	Android camera															YN450M		YN455				
Blackmagic Design	Rangefinder style	High-End Video							Cinema Camera														
Blackmagic Design	Rangefinder style	High-End Video									Pocket Cinema Camera					Pocket Cinema Camera 4K							
Blackmagic Design		High-End Video										Micro Cinema Camera									Micro Studio Camera 4K G2		
Z CAM	Cinema	Advanced											E1			E2							
Z CAM	Cinema	Mid-Range																E2-M4					
Z CAM	Cinema	Entry-Level															E2C						
JVC	Camcorder	Professional										GY-LS300											
SVS-Vistek		Industrial							EVO Tracer														
