= Olympus PEN-F =

Digital camera

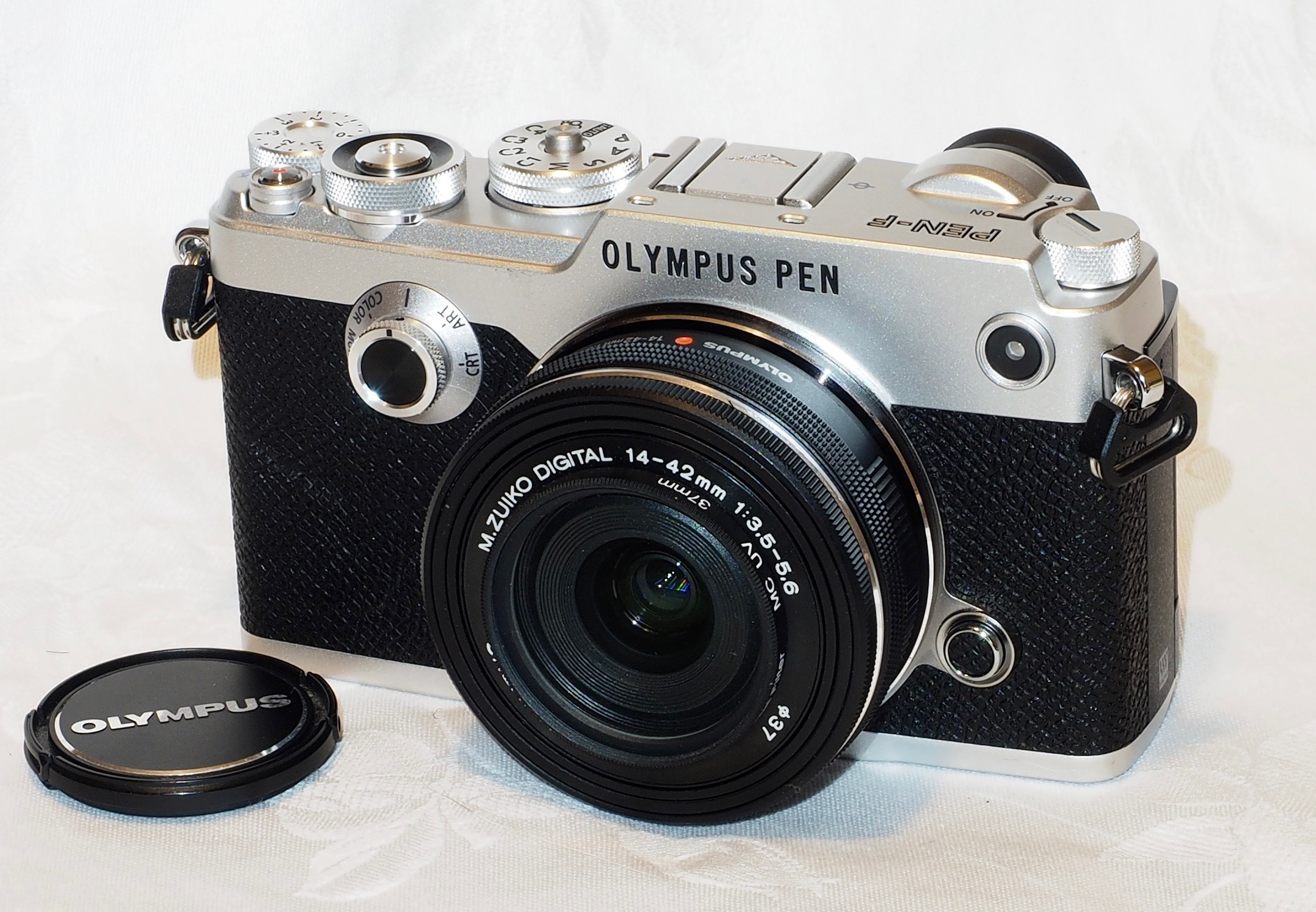

Overview
- Maker: Olympus Corporation
- Released: January 2016
- Intro price: 1,199$

Lens
- Lens mount: Micro Four Thirds
- Lens: Interchangeable

Sensor/medium
- Sensor type: Live MOS
- Sensor size: 17.3 x 13mm (Four Thirds type)
- Sensor maker: Sony
- Maximum resolution: 5184 x 3888 (20 megapixels)
- Film speed: 80-25600
- Recording medium: SD, SDHC or SDXC memory card (UHS I & UHS II), up to 512 GB

Focusing
- Focus areas: 81 contrast-detection focus points

Exposure/metering
- Exposure metering: TTL

Flash
- Flash: No built-in flash, supports external flashes through the hot-shoe

Shutter
- Shutter speeds: 1/8000s to 60s (1/16,000 with e-shutter)
- Continuous shooting: 10.4 frames per second (20 with e-shutter)

Viewfinder
- Viewfinder magnification: 0.62x (35mm equvivalent)
- Frame coverage: 100%

Image processing
- Image processor: TruePic VII Engine
- White balance: Yes

General
- LCD screen: 3 inches with 1,040,000 dots
- Dimensions: 125 x 72 x 37mm (4.9 x 2.8 x 1.5 inches)
- Weight: 434 g (15 oz) including battery
- Made in: Vietnam

Chronology
- Predecessor: Olympus PEN E-P5
- Successor: Olympus PEN E-P7

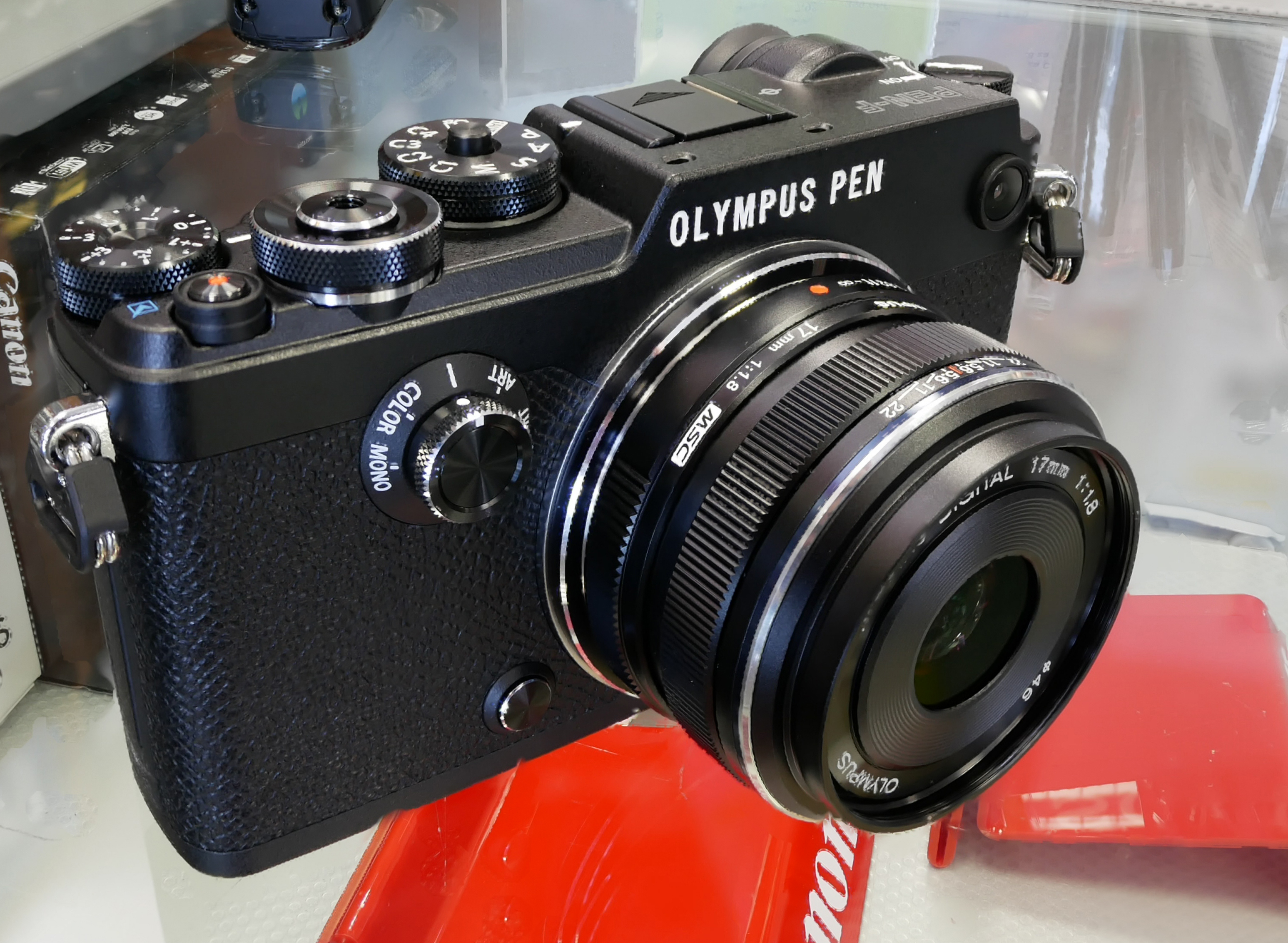
PEN-F in black colour

The Olympus PEN-F is a mirrorless interchangeable-lens camera in the Micro Four Thirds system, released in 2016. It is the part of the digital PEN series. The PEN-F pays tribute to the similarly named PEN F half-frame 35mm film SLR camera from 1963.

The PEN-F was the first Olympus camera to feature the new, 20 megapixel Four Thirds sensor, which made Micro Four Thirds more competitive on the market. This sensor later found its way into the OM-D series as well, featured in professional cameras like the E-M1 Mark III.

The PEN-F had an electronic viewfinder, which was a new feature in the digital PEN range, and it is the only Olympus-era PEN camera to have it.

It has 10 frames per second continuous shooting and its fastest shutter speed is 1/8000 sec, it has focus peaking to assist manual focus, and built in Wi-Fi for connection to smartphone or tablet. Its rear LCD is a fully articulated "swivel" rear touch screen with a 1.04 million pixel resolution. The PEN-F comes in two colour schemes: black, or silver.

== Design ==
The 2016 Olympus PEN-F was inspired by the old Olympus PEN F half-frame SLR, released in 1963

The PEN-F's name and design pays tribute to Olympus's legendary half-frame analog SLR, the PEN F from 1963. It has the same font for the model name on the front of the camera and has a chunky dial on the grip. On the old PEN F, that controls the shutter speed, on the new PEN-F, it is dedicated for changing the art filters. On the new PEN-F there are two customizable dials on the top for changing the shutter speed, or basically anything it has been set to. The overall shape of the cameras are quite similar, they both are rectangle boxes with an asymmetrical "stair" on the top. The completely flat grip is also a similar property of the two cameras. However, the new PEN-F can be extended with an optional, external grip, the ECG-4.

== Specifications ==
- 20MP Live MOS Four Thirds format sensor
- 1/8000 sec top mechanical shutter speed (1/16,000 with e-shutter)
- 5-axis image stabilisation with panning detection
- ISO 80 – 25,600
- Burst rate: Up to 10 fps continuous shooting (20 fps with electronic shutter)
- Focus-peaking to assist manual focus
- Intervalometer and Time Lapse movie creation (up to 99 frames)
- Fully articulating 1.04 million dot, 3" LCD touchscreen
- Built-in Wi-Fi for remote shooting (full control of all settings), image transfer and adding geolocation through smartphone
- 2.36 million dot OLED electronic viewfinder
- Highly customizable interface, twin controls
- 50MP High-res Shot mode
- 1080/60p video recording

== Compared to the Olympus OM-D E-M5 Mark II ==
The PEN-F was sold side-by-side with the Olympus OM-D E-M5 Mark II and shared a lot of its features. The PEN-F started on 1,199$, the E-M5 Mark II cost 100$ less.

- The most obvious difference is the design: The E-M5 is designed after the Olympus OM SLR with the bump on the top, the PEN-F has an almost flat top, which makes it 1.3 centimeter shorter. The E-M5 Mark II has a more ergonomic grip compared to the PEN-F's flat one.
- However, that bump comes with an advantage: The E-M5 Mark II has a bigger viewfinder magnification, than the PEN-F (0.72x vs 0.62x). The resolution of the EVF is the same though.
- The PEN-F has the new 20 MP sensor, which has a 25% higher resolution than the 16 MP sensor of the E-M5 Mark II, and despite its higher pixel density, it maintains the ISO performance and the dynamic range of the old sensor. The higher native resolution means that the sensor-shift high resolution mode produces 50 MP pictures instead of 40 MP.
- The E-M5 Mark II is weather sealed, the PEN-F is not.
- The E-M5 has a microphone 3.5mm jack connector, the PEN-F does not.
- The PEN-F has a dedicated creative dial, used to access the color and monochrome profile controls, which the E-M5 Mark II lacks.

The features that are shared between the two cameras:

- 5-axis sensor stabilization system
- Four Thirds sensor size
- Fully articulated rear LCD screen
- 10 fps burst rate
- 81 contrast-detection autofocus points
- 1080p 60 fps max. video recording resolution and frame rate
- support for UHS-II SD cards

== See also ==
- List of retro-style digital cameras

Brand	Form	Class	2008	2009	2010	2011			2012	2013	2014	2015	2016	2017	2018	2019	2020	2021	2022	2023	2024	2025	2026
Olympus	SLR style OM-D	Professional															E-M1X ^{R}						
Olympus	SLR style OM-D	High-end									E-M1			E-M1 II ^{R}			E-M1 III ^{R}						
Olympus	SLR style OM-D	Advanced							E-M5			E-M5 II ^{R}					E-M5 III ^{R}						
Olympus	SLR style OM-D	Mid-range									E-M10		E-M10 II		E-M10 III			E-M10 IV					
Olympus	Rangefinder style PEN	Mid-range		E-P1	E-P2		E-P3				E-P5		PEN-F ^{R}										
Olympus	Rangefinder style PEN	Upper-entry			E-PL1	E-PL2		E-PL3	E-PL5		E-PL6	E-PL7		E-PL8	E-PL9		E-PL10						
Olympus	Rangefinder style PEN	Entry-level					E-PM1		E-PM2														
Olympus	remote													Air									
OM System	SLR style	Professional																	OM-1 ^{R}		OM-1 II ^{R}		
OM System	SLR style	High-end																				OM-3 ^{R}	
OM System	SLR style	Advanced																		OM-5 ^{R}			OM-5 II ^{R}
OM System	PEN	Mid-range																	E-P7				
Panasonic	SLR style	High-end Video													GH5S				GH6 ^{R}			GH7 ^{R}	
Panasonic	SLR style	High-end Photo													G9 ^{R}						G9 II ^{R}		
Panasonic	SLR style	High-end		GH1		GH2			GH3		GH4				GH5				GH5II				
Panasonic	SLR style	Mid-range		G1	G2		G3		G5		G6		G7	G80/G85			G90/G95						
Panasonic	SLR style	Entry-level			G10													G100			G100D		
Panasonic	Rangefinder style	Advanced							GX1		GX7		GX8		GX9								
Panasonic	Rangefinder style	Mid-range									GM1	GM5	GX80/GX85										
Panasonic	Rangefinder style	Entry-level			GF1	GF2	GF3		GF5		GF6	GF7	GF8	GX800/GX850/GF9		GX880/GF10/GF90							
Panasonic	Camcorder	Professional							AG-AF104														
Kodak	Rangefinder style	Entry-level										S-1											
DJI	Drone	.												Zenmuse X5S									
DJI	Drone	.												Zenmuse X5									
YI	Rangefinder style	Entry-level												M1									
Yongnuo	Rangefinder style	Android camera															YN450M		YN455				
Blackmagic Design	Rangefinder style	High-End Video							Cinema Camera														
Blackmagic Design	Rangefinder style	High-End Video									Pocket Cinema Camera					Pocket Cinema Camera 4K							
Blackmagic Design		High-End Video										Micro Cinema Camera									Micro Studio Camera 4K G2		
Z CAM	Cinema	Advanced											E1			E2							
Z CAM	Cinema	Mid-Range																E2-M4					
Z CAM	Cinema	Entry-Level															E2C						
JVC	Camcorder	Professional										GY-LS300											
SVS-Vistek		Industrial							EVO Tracer														
