= Olympus Pen =

Families of half-frame film cameras and digital compact cameras

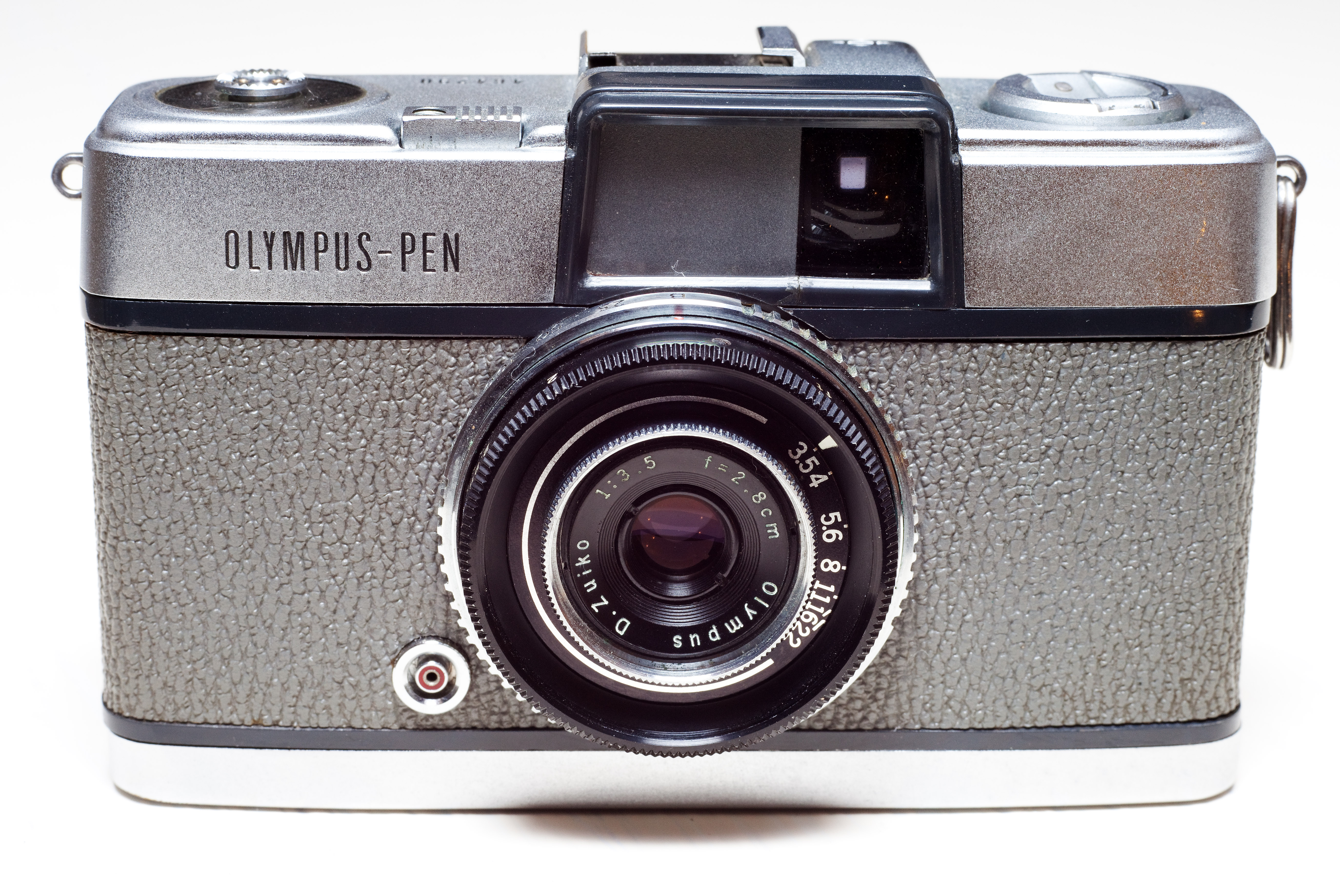
The first Olympus Pen, 1959

The Pen or PEN series is an Olympus camera brand. It was used on analog half-frame compact and SLR models from 1959 until the early 1980s. In 2009, Olympus released the PEN E-P1, a digital mirrorless interchangeable-lens camera, which opened the range of Digital PEN models, which are still sold today. Olympus Corporation's camera division since has been bought by Japan Industrial Partners, and run under the OM Digital Solutions name. They continue to run the Digital PEN series.

== General context ==
The original Pen was introduced in 1959. It was designed by Yoshihisa Maitani, and was the first half-frame camera produced in Japan. It was one of the smallest cameras to use 35 mm film in regular 135 cassettes.

A series of derivatives followed, some easier to use with the introduction of exposure automation, e.g. the Pen EE; others with a wider aperture lens and a manual meter, such as the Pen D.

In 1966 the arrival of the Rollei 35, a camera almost as compact but making normal 24×36 exposures, would announce the beginning of the end for the half-frame concept. However, Olympus went on producing the simpler models of the Pen family until at least 1983.

In the descriptions below, the focal lengths indicated do not give the same angle of view as for full-frame cameras: 30 mm on the Pen is roughly equivalent to 45 mm on a full-frame, and 28 mm to a 40 mm.

== Pen and Pen S ==
The original Pen is a very compact half-frame camera, with just a viewfinder, no meter and fully manual settings. It has a 28 mm f/3.5 D.Zuiko lens. Its shutter settings are 1/25, 1/50, 1/100, 1/200 and B; its aperture range from f/3.5 to f/22. The back is removed completely for film loading and unloading.

The Pen S is almost the same camera, with the following shutter settings: 1/8, 1/15, 1/30, 1/60, 1/125, 1/250 and B. It existed in two versions, with a 30 mm f/2.8 lens or a 28 mm f/3.5 lens.

== D series ==
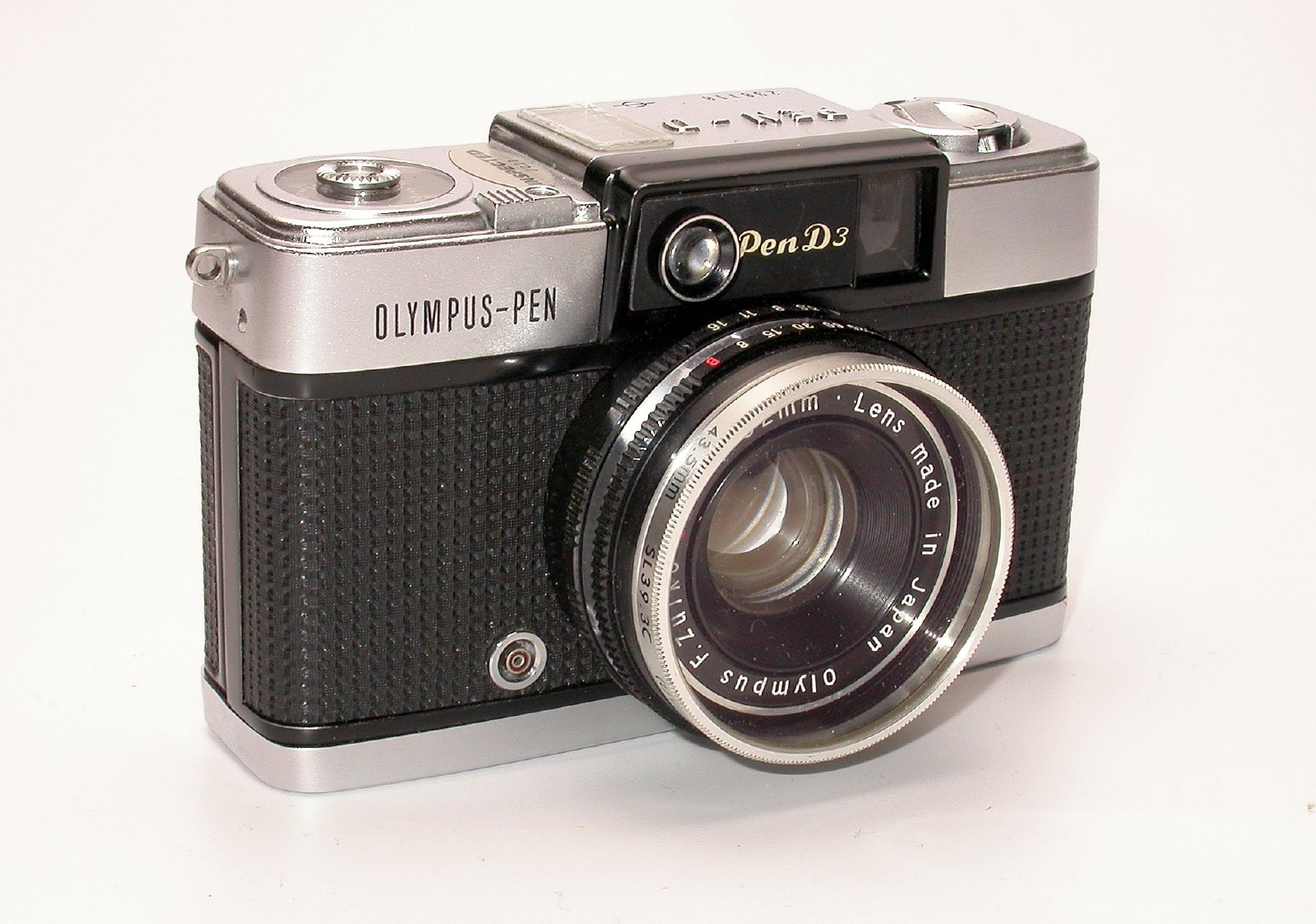
Pen D3

The Pen D was a more expensive model, launched in 1962. It has a 32 mm f/1.9 lens, a shutter going to 1/500 and an uncoupled selenium meter.

The Pen D2, launched in 1964, is the same model with an uncoupled cadmium sulfide (CdS) exposure meter replacing the selenium one.

The Pen D3, launched in 1965, is the same with a 32 mm f/1.7 lens.

== EE series ==
The Pen EE was introduced in 1961 and was the amateur model, with fully automatic exposure and fixed focusing. It is a true point and shoot camera, and has a 28 mm f/3.5 lens. The Pen EE family is easily recognized by the selenium meter window around the lens.

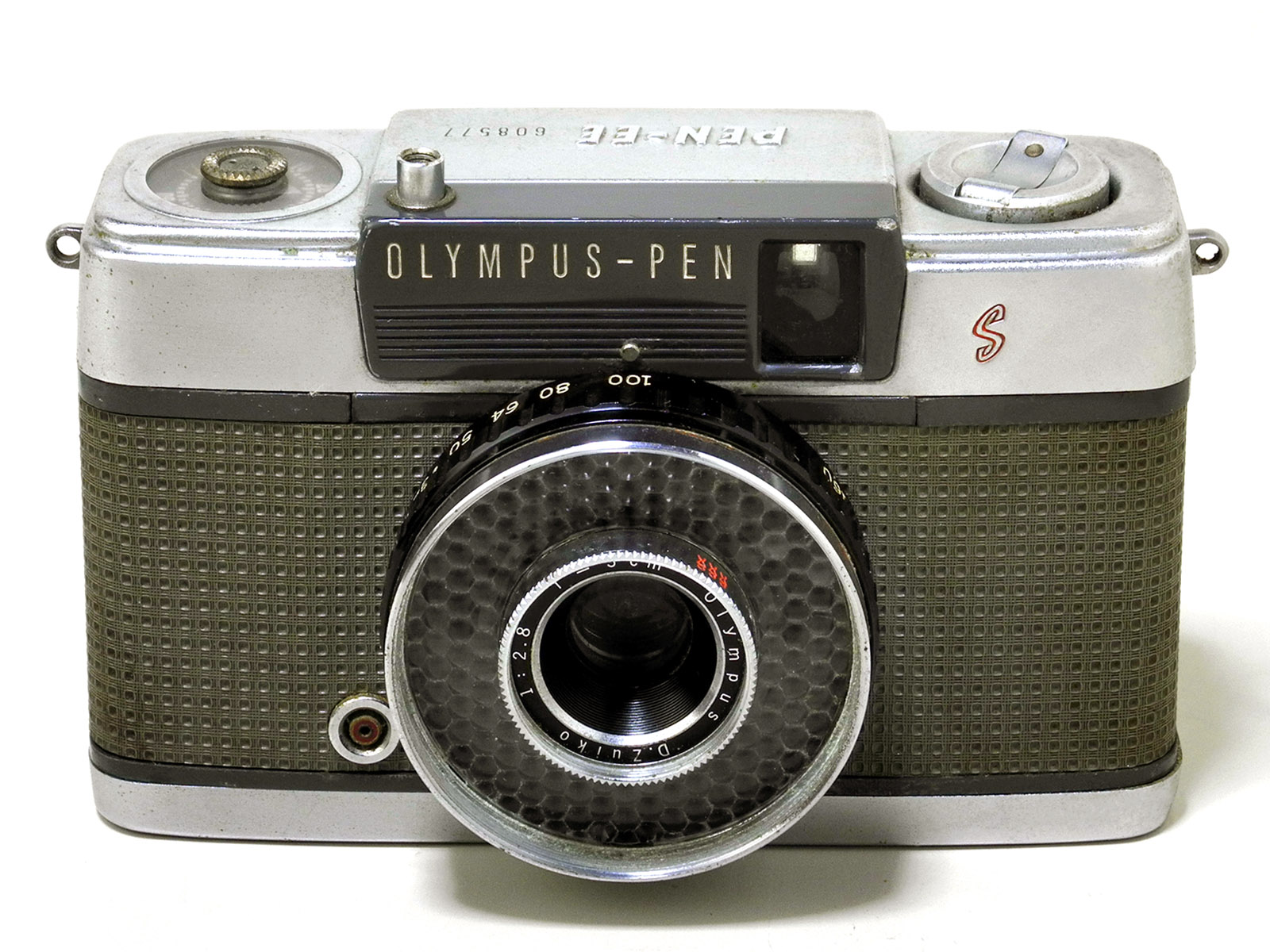
Pen EE-S

The Pen EE-S, launched in 1962, is the same model with a 30 mm f/2.8 and a focusing ring, made necessary by the wider aperture. The focusing ring has marking for three zones (close (1.2m), group (3m), and scene) and can be adjusted from 90cm to infinity.

In 1966 the two cameras were slightly modified and became the Pen EE (EL) and Pen EE-S (EL) with a modification of the take-up spool to make film loading easier. EL stands for Easy Loading. They can only be recognized by a small EL label on the front, or by examining the take-up spool.

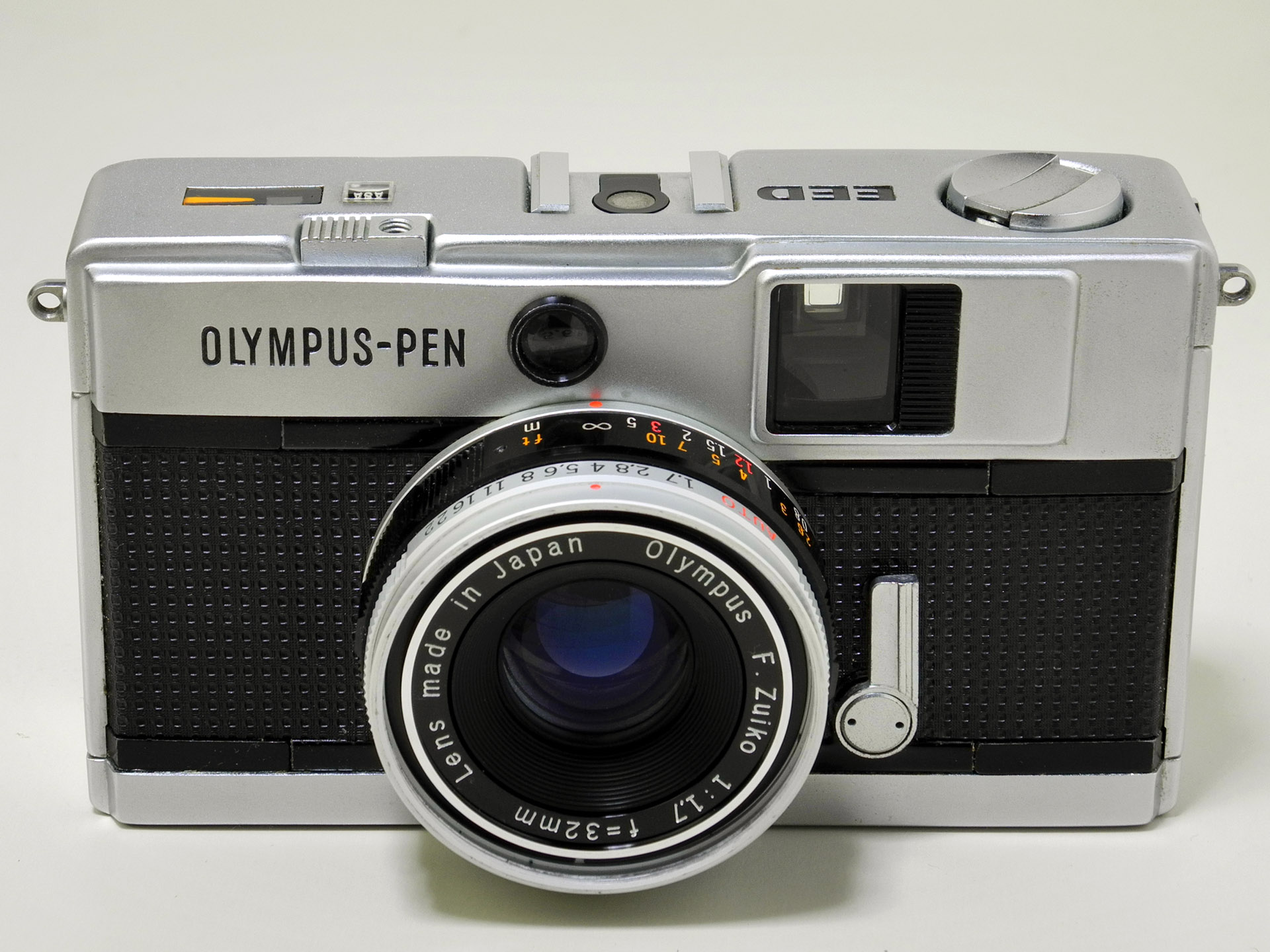
Pen EED

The Pen EED, produced from 1967 to 1972, is a more expensive auto-exposure model, with a CdS meter, a 32 mm f/1.7 lens, a self timer and a hot shoe.

The Pen EE-2, produced from 1968 to 1977, is nearly the same as the Pen EE with the addition of a hot shoe.

The Pen EES-2, produced from 1968 to 1971, is the same as the Pen EE-S with the addition of a hot shoe and a more modern range of film speed settings.

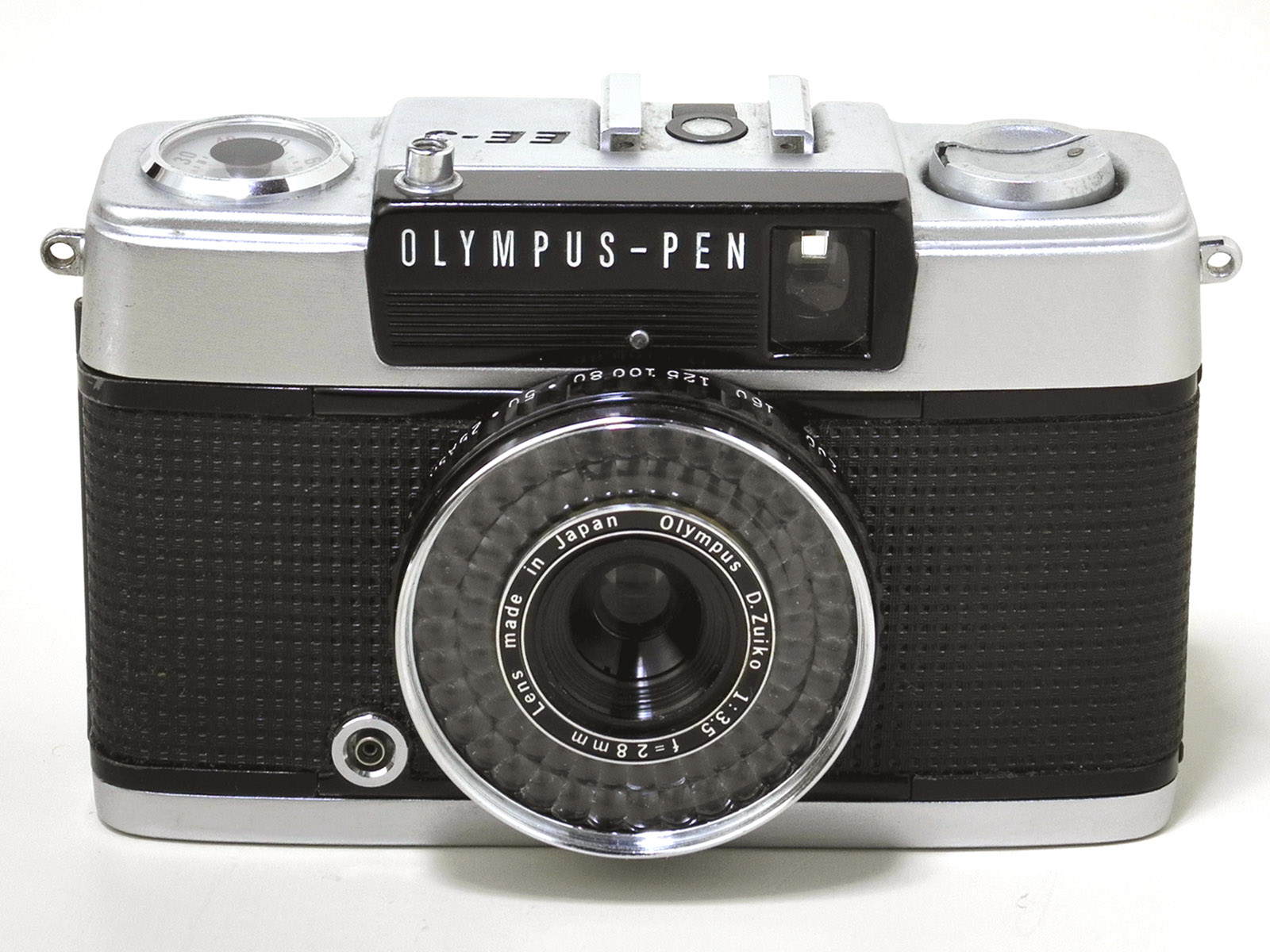
Pen EE-3

The Pen EE-3, produced from 1973 to 1983, seems to be almost exactly the same camera except that it added the "Flashmatic" system when used with the matching GN14 flash.

The Pen EF, launched in 1981, was the last Pen model. It is like the Pen EE-2 or Pen EE-3, but with a small built-in flash, and was only sold in black finish with white lettering. It also functions at a larger range of shutter speeds.

Model	Lens	Year introduced	Light meter	Focusing	Shutter speeds	Film speeds (ISO)	Additional features
Pen EE (EL)	D.Zuiko 28 mm f/3.5	1961	Selenium cell	Fixed focus	1/40 or 1/200	10–200	
Pen EE-S (EL)	D.Zuiko 30 mm f/2.8	1962	Selenium cell	Scale focus	1/40 or 1/200	10–200	
Pen EED	F.Zuiko 32 mm f/1.7	1967	CdS meter	Scale focus	1/15 - 1/500	12–400	Hot shoe, self timer
Pen EE-2	D.Zuiko 28 mm f/3.5	1968	Selenium cell	Fixed focus	1/40 or 1/200	25–400	Hot shoe
Pen EES-2	D.Zuiko 30 mm f/2.8	1968	Selenium cell	Scale focus	1/40 or 1/200	25–400	Hot shoe
Pen EE-3	D.Zuiko 28 mm f/3.5	1973	Selenium cell	Fixed focus	1/40 or 1/200	25–400	Hot shoe
Pen EF	D.Zuiko 28 mm f/3.5	1981	Selenium cell	Fixed focus	1/30 - 1/250	25–400	Built-in flash

== Pen Wide ==
The Pen W or Pen Wide is a very rare variant of the Pen S model, with a wide-angle 25 mm f/2.8 lens, equivalent to a 35 mm in full-frame. It only exists in black finish, and has a cold flash shoe. It was only produced between 1964 and 1965, and today fetches high prices on the collectors' market.

== Pen EM ==
The Pen EM, produced from 1965 to 1966, is a motorized Pen model. It has a 35 mm f/2 lens, and a CdS exposure meter allowing automatic or manual exposure.

== Pen F, Pen FT, Pen FV ==
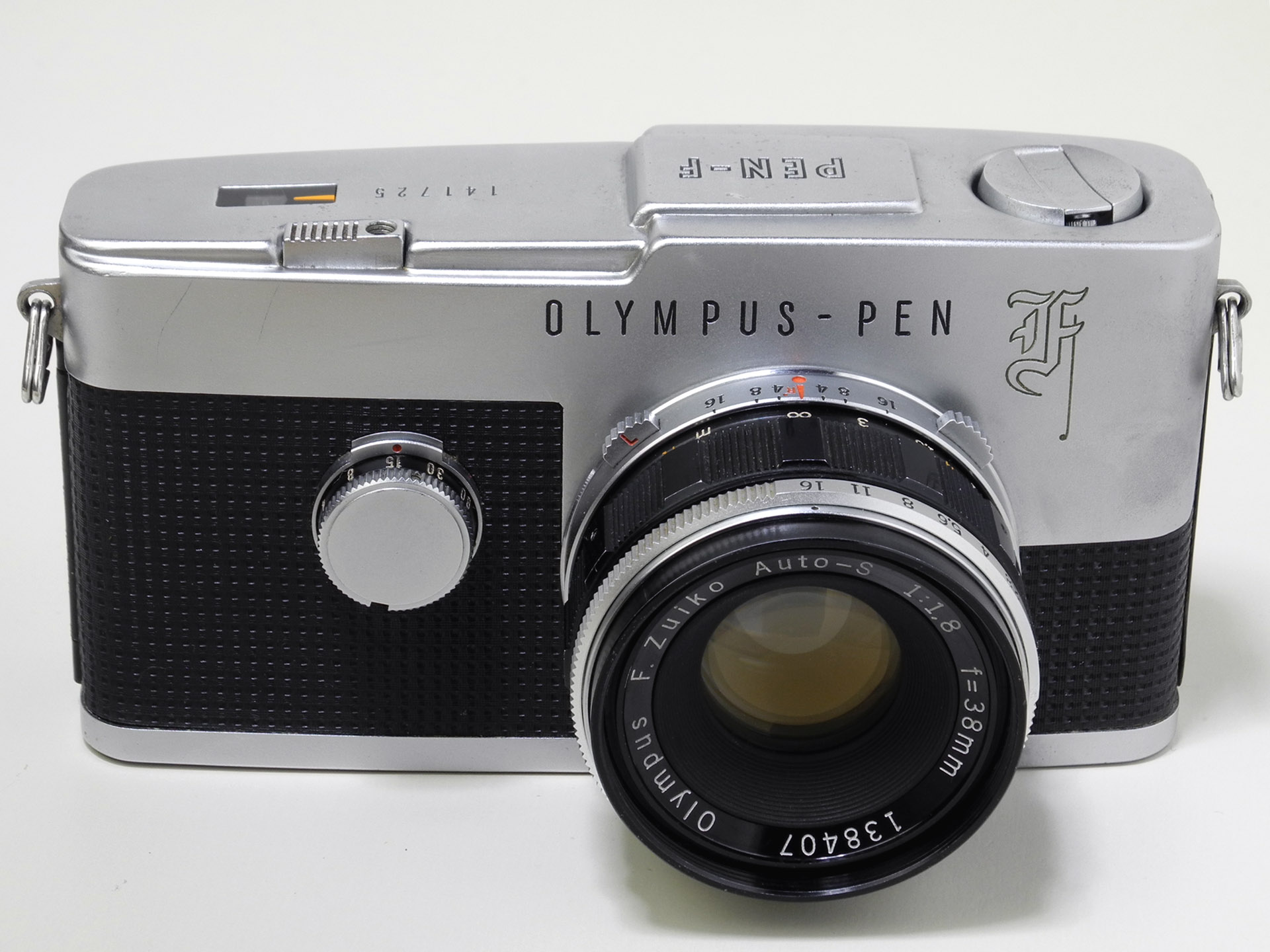
Pen F

The Olympus Pen F series of cameras were half-frame SLR cameras produced between 1963 and 1970. The cameras were unique in using a rotary shutter which enabled them to be X-synchronized at all shutter speeds including 1/500 s.

== Pen Rapid models ==
The Pen Rapid EE-S and Pen Rapid EED were variants of the Pen EE-S and Pen EED designed to accept the Agfa Rapid cassette instead of the regular 35 mm cassette. They were both made from 1965 to 1966, and met very little success.

== Digital PEN ==
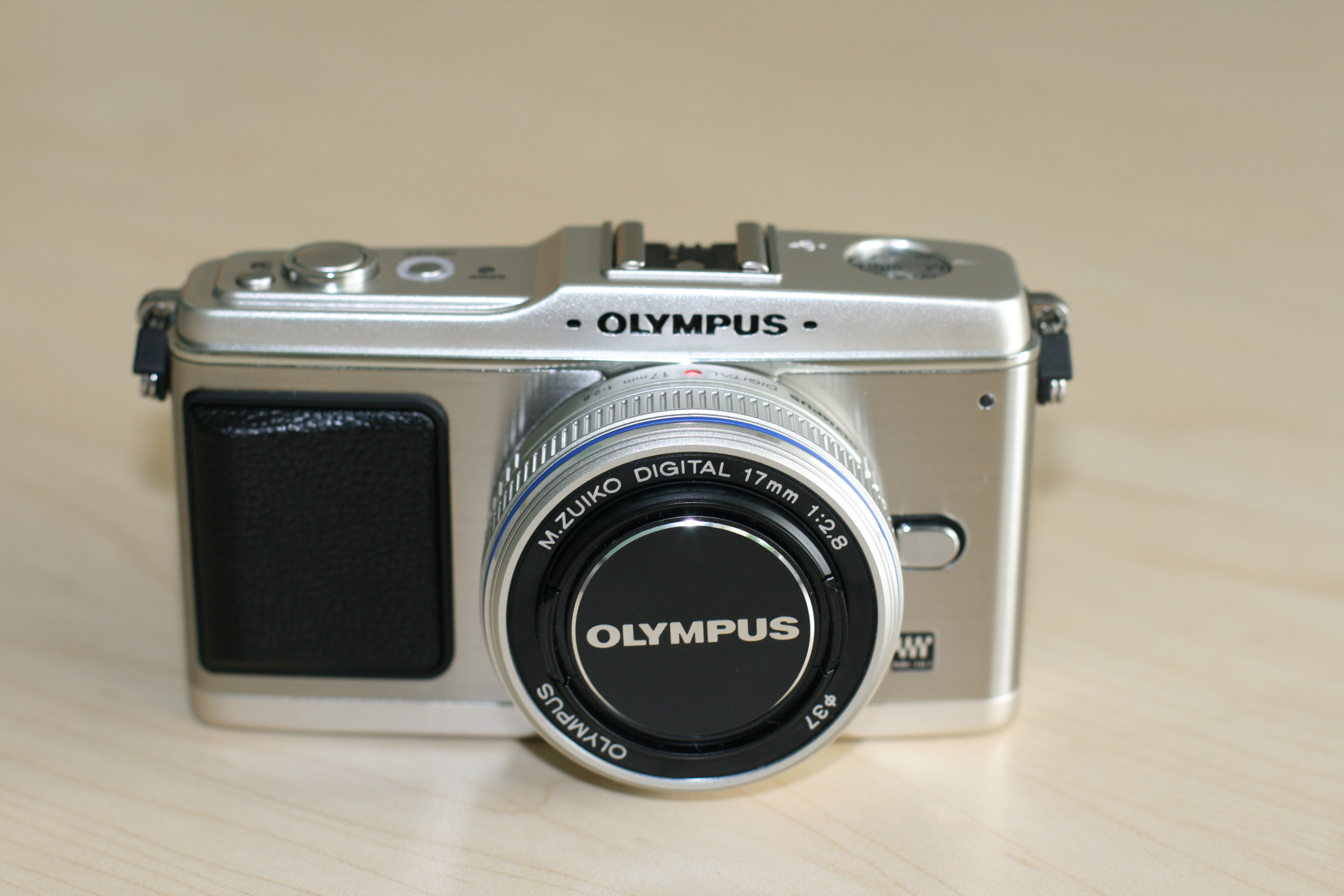
Olympus PEN E-P1, the first digital PEN camera

The Digital PEN series is a wide range of mirrorless interchangeable lens digital cameras made by Olympus. They use the Micro Four Thirds system, so they all have a 17.3 x 13 mm Four Thirds size image sensor and autofocus. The first digital PEN was the E-P1, released in June 2009. The latest is the OM System PEN, released September 9, 2026 as the first one under this OM System brand.

There are three lines in the Digital PEN series of Olympus: The main PEN range (E-P), the PEN Lite (E-PL) and the PEN Mini (E-PM).

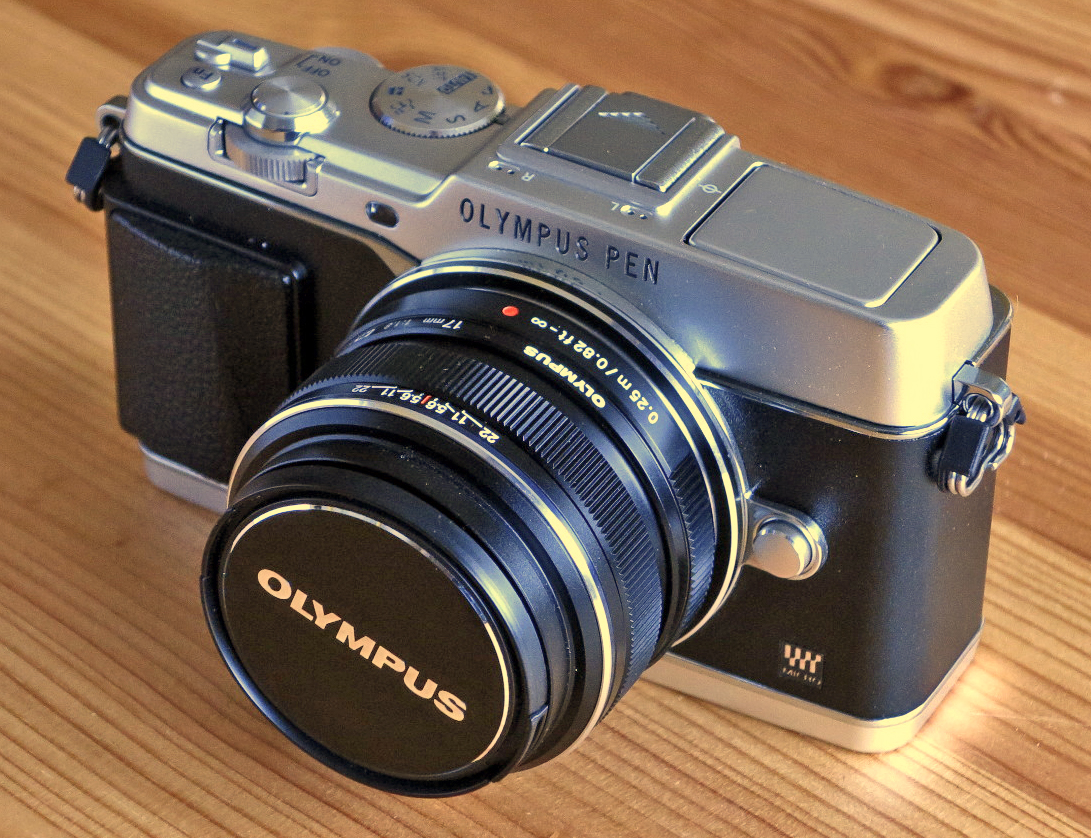
Olympus E-P5, the last of the PEN series cameras made under ownership of the Olympus Corporation before the purchase of the brand by OM Digital Solutions.

Main PEN range: The Olympus PEN E-P1 was the first digital PEN and the second camera in the Micro Four Thirds system. It revolutionized the camera market, because it was the first mirrorless camera which really took advantage of its size. It included a 12 Megapixel Four Thirds size sensor, which had the same image quality as a Four Thirds DSLR camera, but was packed in a much smaller body. It also included a 3-axis sensor-shift image stabilization system. It carries on in the PEN tradition with its external design clearly inspired by the traditional PEN series. The next model in this category was the E-P2, released in April 2010, which added several features, most notably, the multi-functional accessory port under the hot shoe for an optional external electronic viewfinder or an external microphone. The E-P3 followed in 2011 which added 1080p video recording, a built-in flash, and a touch screen. Olympus claimed the E-P3 to have the world's fastest autofocus system. The E-P5 arrived 2013 which inherited more professional OM-D E-M5, including the new 16 megapixel sensor, 5-axis sensor stabilization system, and a tilting LCD screen. Brand new to the Micro Thirds System, the E-P5 added a maximum shutter speed of 1/8000s. After 8 years, the main E-P series got updated in 2021, now under OM Digital Solutions' leadership. They skipped the number 6, and named the camera E-P7. The E-P7 shares a lot of its internals with the OM-D E-M10 Mark IV. The design resembles the PEN-F, though it lacks an electronic viewfinder like the previous E-P models. It cannot be used with an external viewfinder though, unlike its predecessors.

PEN Lite range: The Olympus PEN Lite range started off with the E-PL1. It was released one month after the E-P2 as a cheaper, more beginner friendly option. Their main features were identical, like the 12 MP image sensor, or the 3-axis sensor stabilization system. But there were a few corner-cuts. The E-PL1 had a fastest shutter speed of 1/2000s instead of 1/4000s, a little bit smaller LCD screen (2.7" vs 3") and less premium material usage. The next model was the E-PL2 (2011 Q1), with a bigger and higher resolution LCD screen, then the E-PL3 (2011 Q4), with a higher, 6 fps burst rate. The E-PL5 was the first PEN Lite model to include the E-M5's 16 MP sensor, but maintaining the 3-axis image stabilization from the older cameras. The E-PL6 (2014 Q3) was not a very innovative model with the only new feature being the time lapse recording capability compared to the E-PL5. The E-PL7 was actually announced one month later with a design change, built-in Wi-Fi and a selfie-friendly higher resolution LCD screen. The E-PL8 from Q4 2016 ran with little development: the only major difference between the E-PL7 and the E-PL8 was the design. The next model was the E-PL9 (2018 Q1), where the max. ISO sensitivity was cut back from 25,600 to 6,400; however, it packed 4K video recording and reintroduced the built-in flash in the PEN Lite range. The current model in this category is the E-PL10, released in Q4 2019. It did not really include any major innovation compared to its predecessor.

PEN Mini range: The Olympus PEN Mini was a short-lived category in the digital PEN range. It is not necessarily smaller than the higher-end PEN models, but it simplifies the controls to make the camera more beginner-friendly. The first model in it was the E-PM1, released in Q4 2011. It had the same features and the same size as the E-PL3, but with a simplified button layout and ergonomics. The E-PM2 was released in Q2 2013, it had the same differences compared to the E-PL5.

There is one more model in the Digital PEN range, which does not really fit any of these categories. It is the digital PEN-F from 2016. It pays tribute to the above-mentioned old PEN F half-frame SLR. These cameras look alike as well. The new PEN-F shares a lot of its features with the Olympus OM-D E-M5 Mark II, and also has a built-in electronic viewfinder, which is a unique feature among digital PEN cameras. It is still the most advanced PEN camera as of January 2021. The PEN-F was also the first Olympus camera to use the new, 20 MP sensor, which later ended up in professional bodies like the E-M1 Mark II.

In the cameras that support it, Olympus offers a mobile app called OI.Share (Olympus Image Share), which is free and can be used for taking self-portraits and share message. The app will show a live preview of your image via a Wi-Fi connection to the camera and let you control a host of camera functions from zoom to new art filters before you take the shot which will then download to your smartphone to let you post on social media.

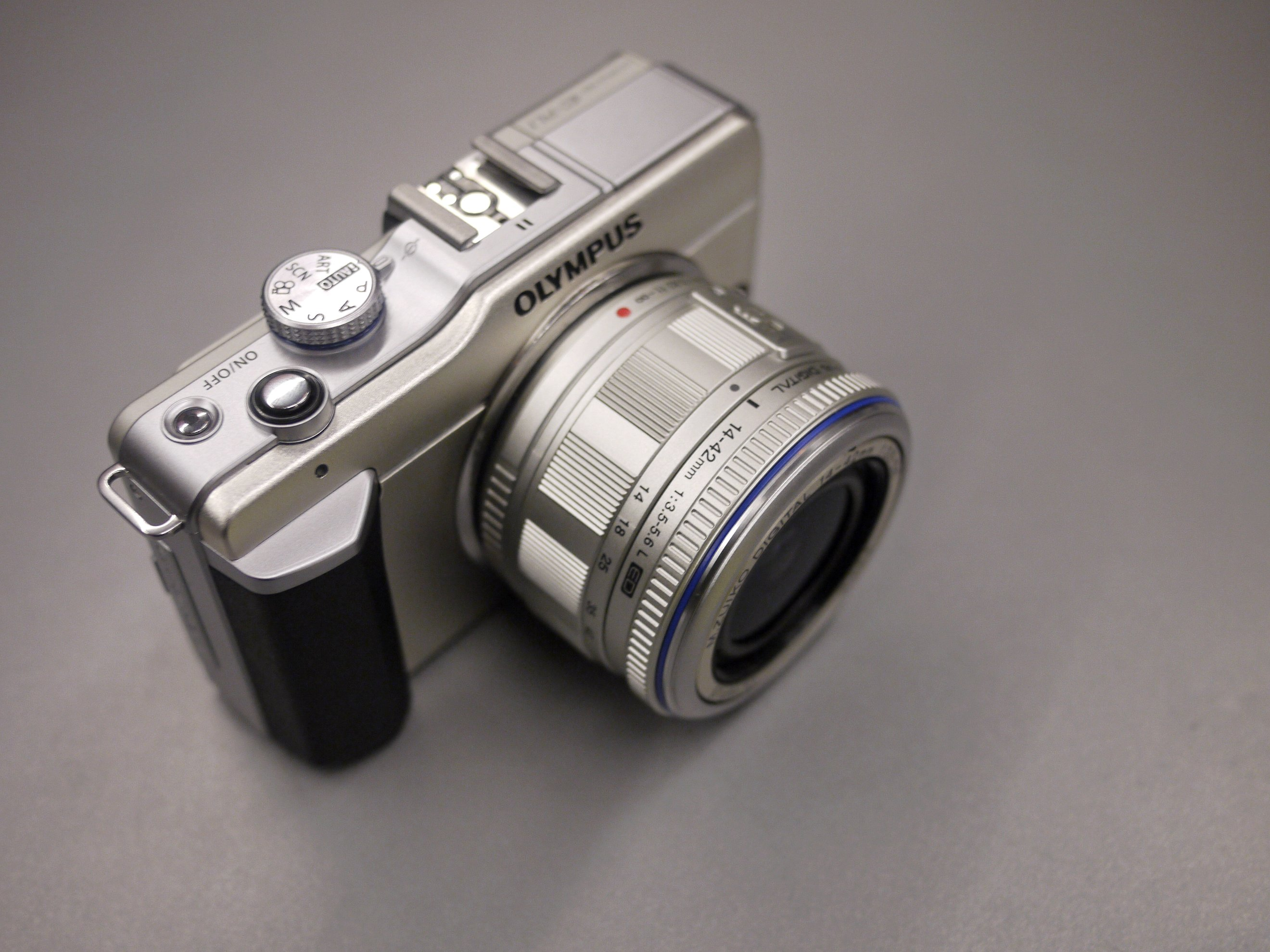
The Olympus PEN E-PL1 was a cheaper and more beginner-friendly alternative to the E-P1 and E-P2

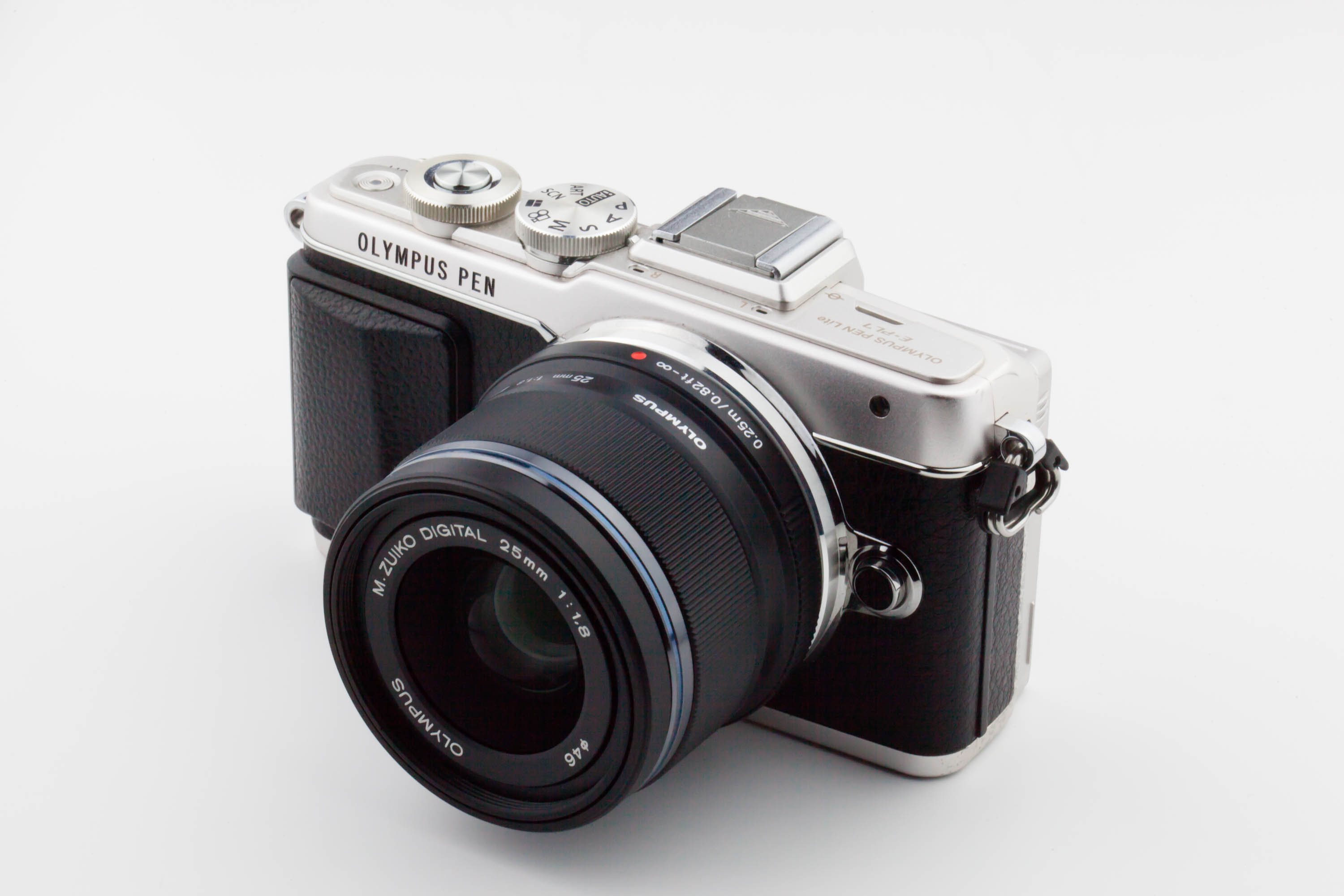
The E-PL7 was the first Olympus camera to have a selfie-friendly LCD screen

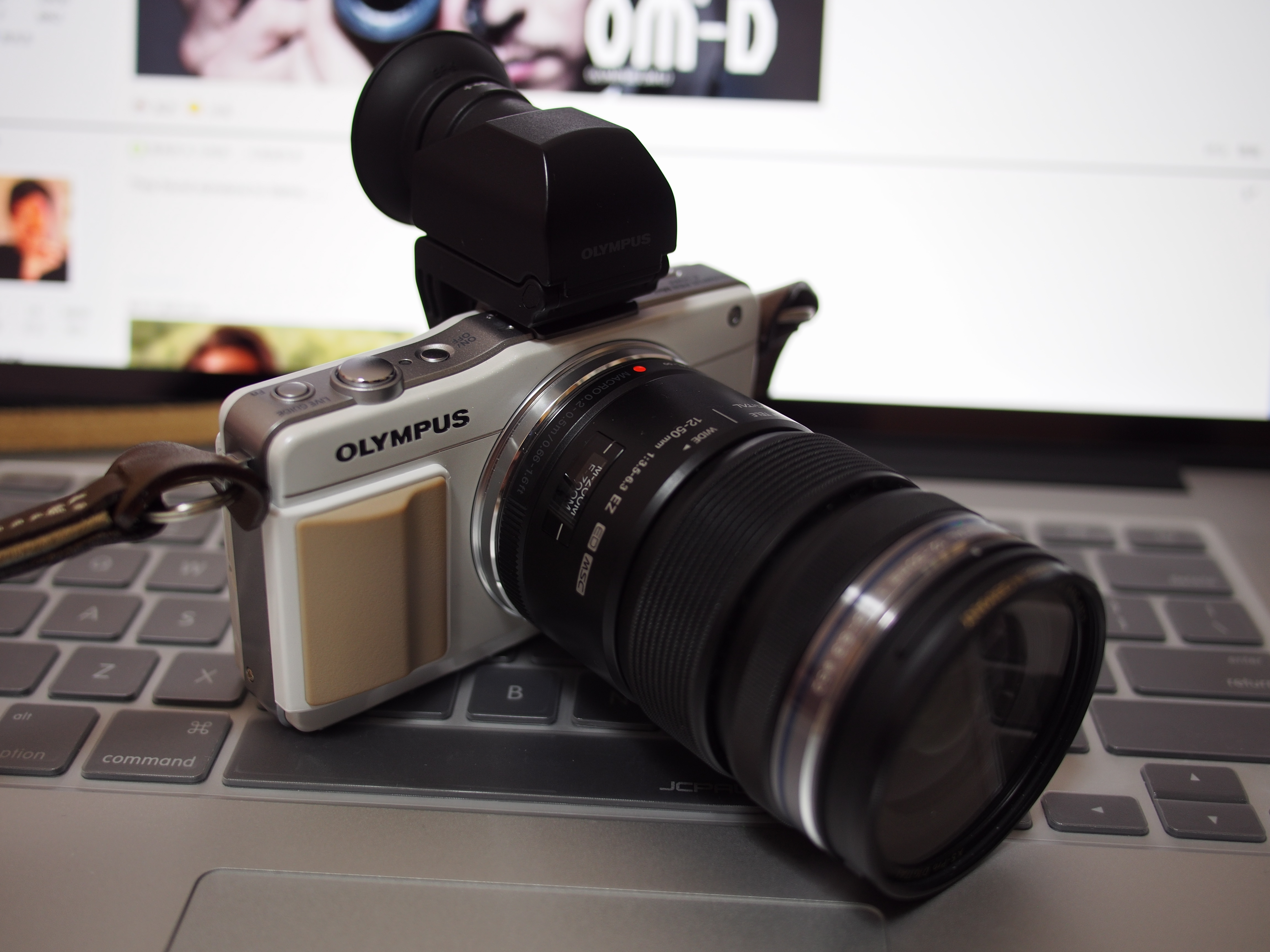
The E-PM2 was an even more beginner friendly version of the E-PL5.

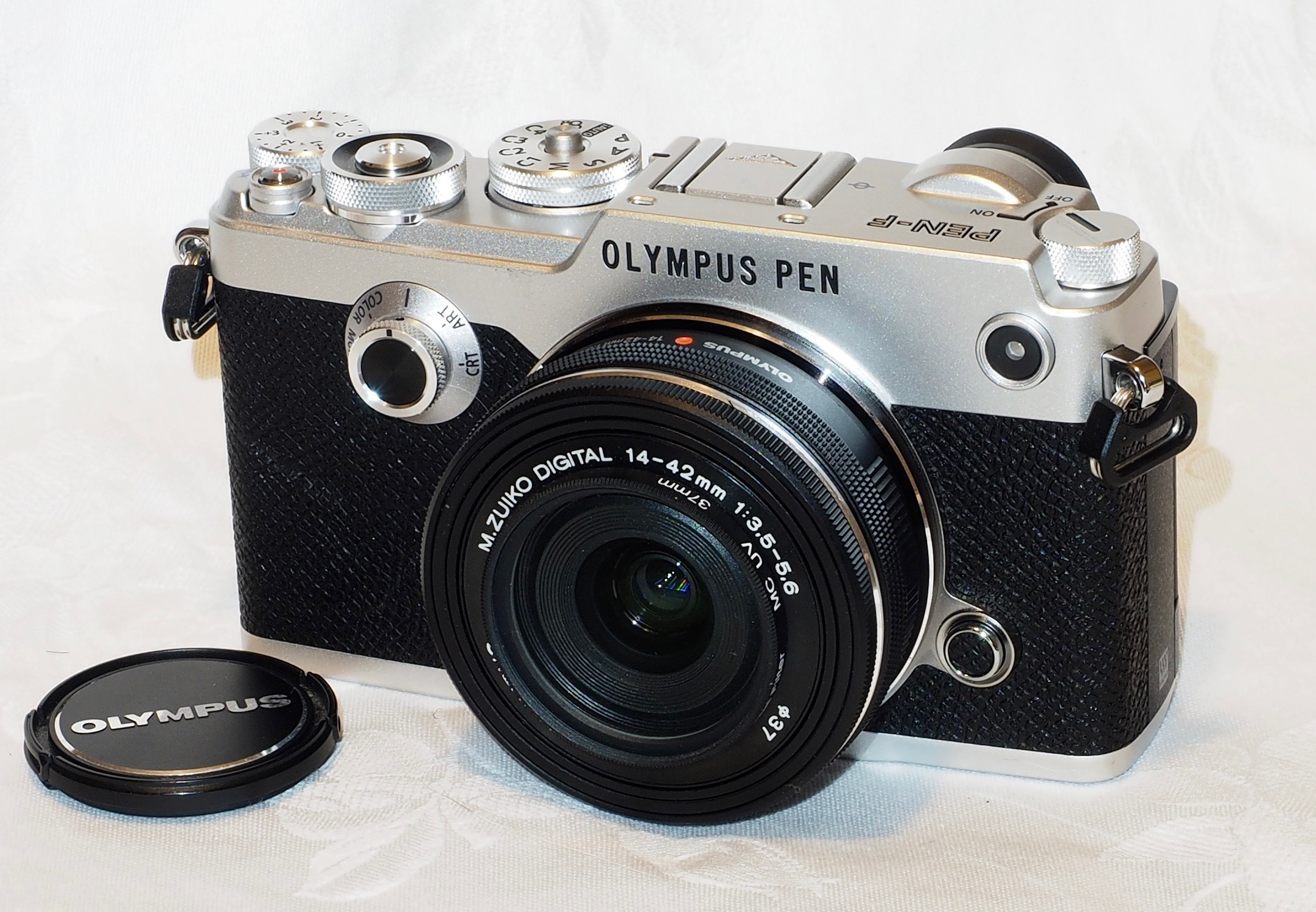
The 2016 Olympus PEN-F pays tribute to the old 1960's PEN F-series half-frame cameras with its name and design
