= Olympus PEN E-P5 =

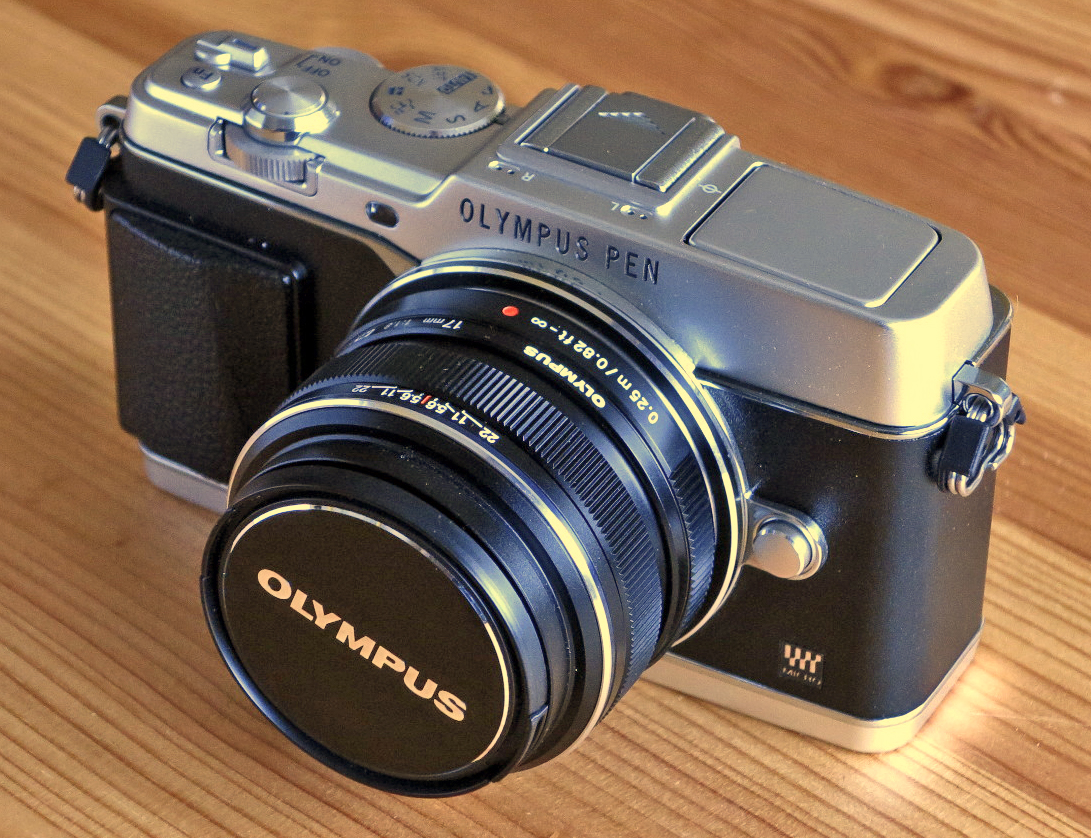

Overview
- Maker: Olympus Corporation
- Type: Mirrorless interchangeable-lens camera
- Released: October 2013
- Production: 2013-2017

Lens
- Lens: Interchangeable

Sensor/medium
- Sensor type: Live MOS
- Sensor size: Four Thirds (13x17.3mm)
- Recording medium: SD card

Focusing
- Focus: Supports autofocus lenses

Exposure/metering
- Exposure metering: TTL

Flash
- Flash: Built-In+supports external flashes through the hot shoe

Shutter
- Frame rate: 9 fps

Viewfinder
- Viewfinder: Optional external OVF or EVF

General
- LCD screen: 3" 1.03m pixel resolution
- Weight: 420 g (15 oz)

Chronology
- Predecessor: Olympus PEN E-P3
- Successor: Olympus PEN E-P7

The Olympus PEN E-P5 is a mirrorless interchangeable-lens camera in the micro four thirds system released in October 2013 and produced by the Japanese Olympus Corporation. This is, despite its number, the fourth model in the PEN E-P range. It remained the latest model in the E-P series until the introduction of the E-P7 in the summer of 2021. It includes the same 16 MP sensor as the Olympus OM-D E-M5. The E-P5 comes in three colour schemes: black, silver and white.

Specifications:

- 16MP Four Thirds sized (13x17.3mm) Live MOS sensor
- 1/8000s top shutter speed
- 5-axis image stabilization with panning detection
- ISO 100 – 25,600
- Burst rate: up to 9 frames per second (5 with continuous auto focus)
- Focus-peaking to assist manual focus
- Intervalometer and Time Lapse movie creation (up to 99 frames)
- 3" LCD touchscreen
- Built-in Wi-Fi for remote shooting (full control of all settings), image transfer and adding geolocation through smartphone

== Compared to its predecessor Olympus PEN E-P3 ==
- improved 5-axis sensor stabilization vs 2-axis sensor stabilization
- enhanced in-camera RAW conversion
- HDR bracketing
- fastest shutter speed 1/8000s vs 1/4000s - 1 EV faster
- Wi-Fi connectivity
- 9 fps burst rate vs 3 fps
- new 16 MPx sensor from the E-M5 vs 12 MPx
- higher maximum ISO: 25,600 vs 12,800
- tilting LCD screen vs fixed LCD screen
- Ergonomics: The thumb roller and the adjusting wheel around the d-pad have been replaced with customizable top dials.

== Compared to the Olympus OM-D E-M5 ==
In 2012, Olympus started the OM-D series with the E-M5 as their more professional line compared to their PEN series, which had been running for a few years. The main criticism for the PEN series was the lack of built-in viewfinder, the lack of weather-sealing and the weird ergonomics for some. Olympus worked on fixing these when they made the E-M5, and some of its features were incorporated in the E-P5.

- The E-P5 got the new 16 MPx sensor from the E-M5. Previously, every Olympus Micro Four Thirds camera had a 12 MPx sensor.
- The E-P5 got the 5-axis sensor stabilization with 4 EV efficiency.
- The same 9 fps burst. The low burst rate was a common weakness of previous Micro Four Thirds cameras.
- Tilting rear LCD screen.

There were features where the E-P5 was even better than the E-M5:

- It had 1/8000s fastest shutter speed instead of 1/4000s.
- It had a lot higher resolution rear LCD screen: 1.03 million pixels vs 610k
- It had built-in Wi-Fi capabilities.
- It had a built-in flash.

However, the E-M5 had a major feature, the built-in electronic viewfinder, which the PEN series lacked until the PEN F's digital version, which was released in 2016. The EVF became a mainstream feature in the lower categories of mirrorless cameras as well, so the PEN series went to a decline, and a new camera in the main PEN series was not seen again until the E-P7 in 2021.

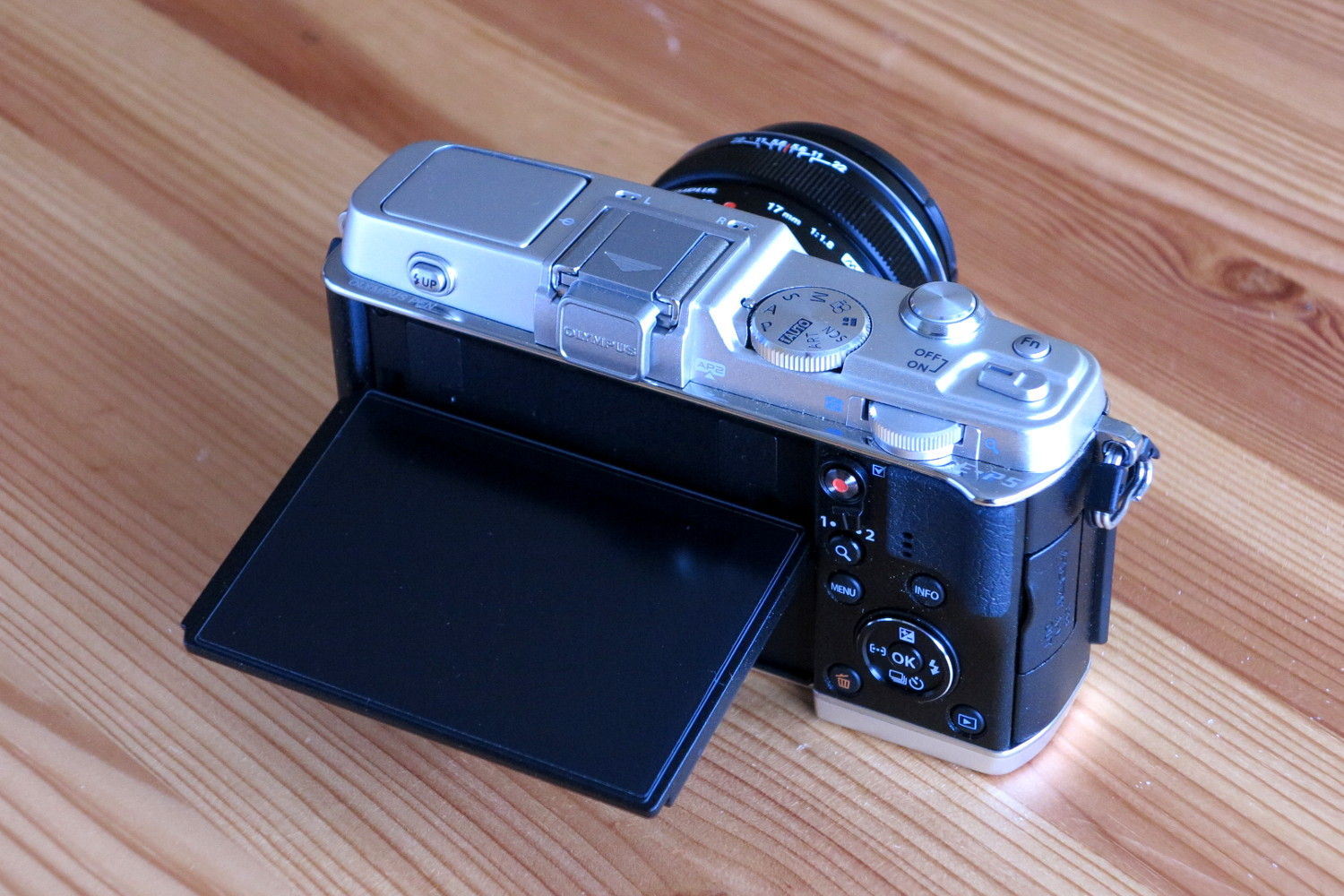
The tilting LCD screen of the Olympus E-P5

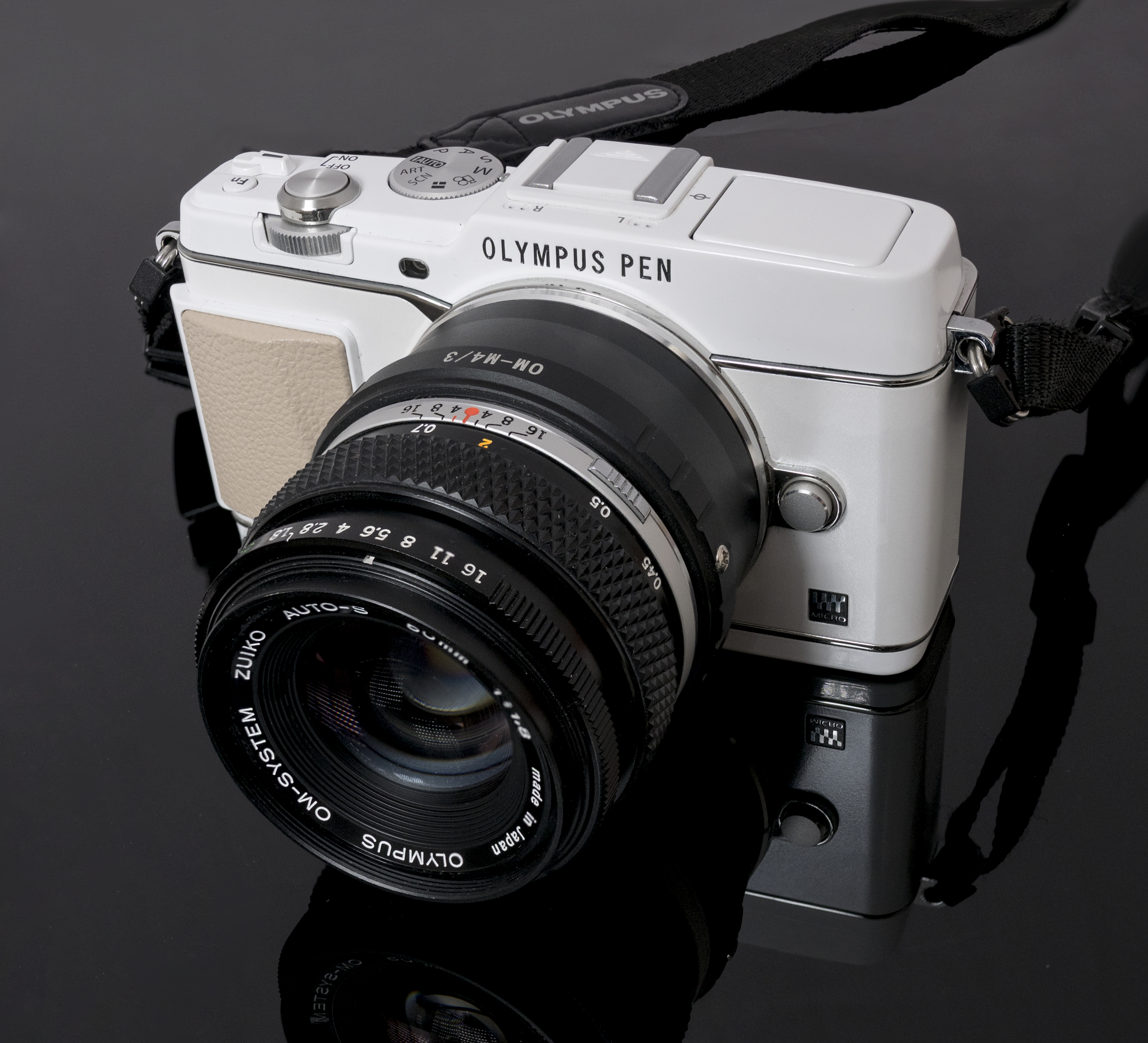
The white version

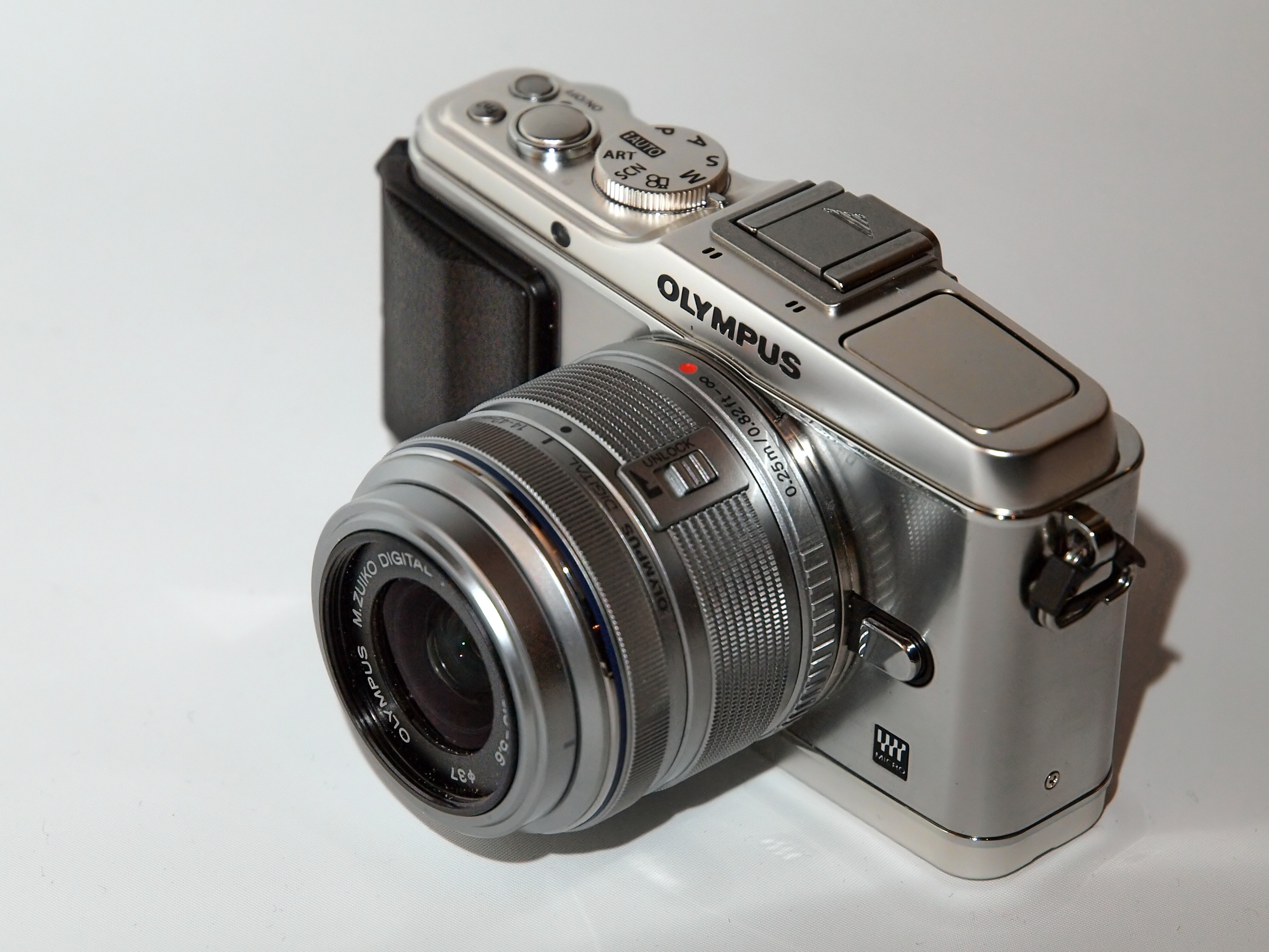
The E-P5's predecessor, the E-P3

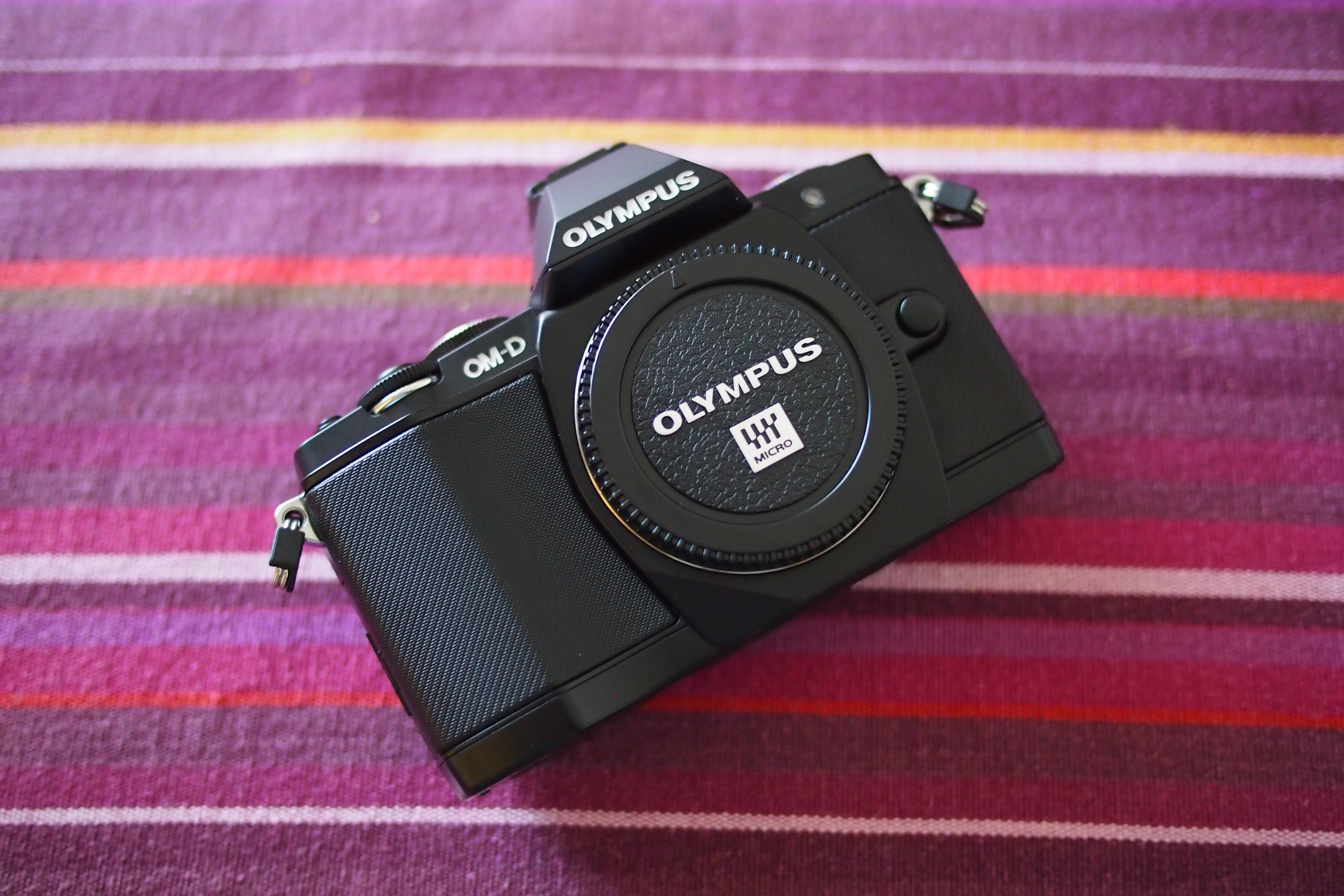
The E-P5 got its 16 MPx sensor from the E-M5

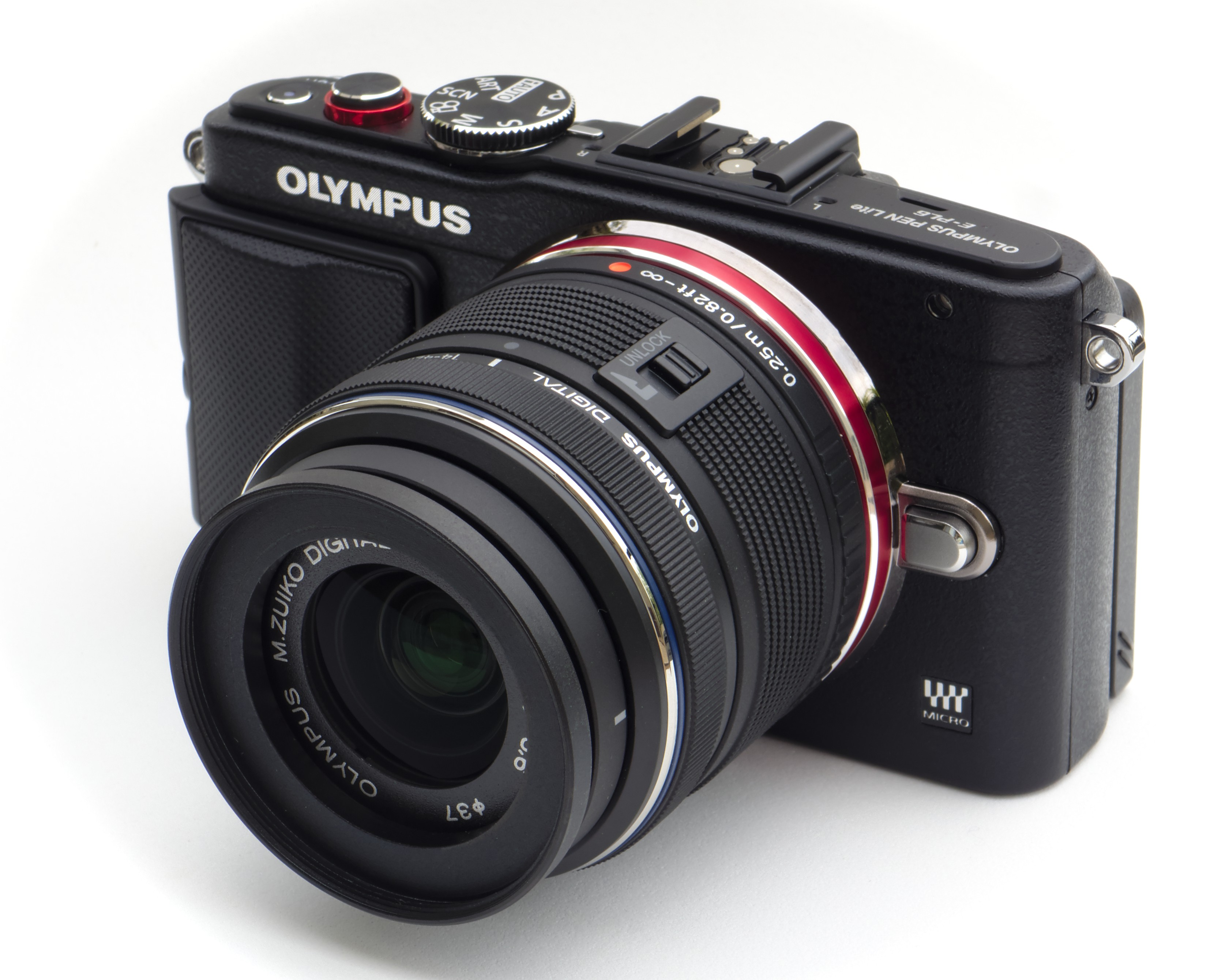
The Olympus E-PL6 was the cheaper alternative to the E-P5

Brand	Form	Class	2008	2009	2010	2011			2012	2013	2014	2015	2016	2017	2018	2019	2020	2021	2022	2023	2024	2025	2026
Olympus	SLR style OM-D	Professional															E-M1X ^{R}						
Olympus	SLR style OM-D	High-end									E-M1			E-M1 II ^{R}			E-M1 III ^{R}						
Olympus	SLR style OM-D	Advanced							E-M5			E-M5 II ^{R}					E-M5 III ^{R}						
Olympus	SLR style OM-D	Mid-range									E-M10		E-M10 II		E-M10 III			E-M10 IV					
Olympus	Rangefinder style PEN	Mid-range		E-P1	E-P2		E-P3				E-P5		PEN-F ^{R}										
Olympus	Rangefinder style PEN	Upper-entry			E-PL1	E-PL2		E-PL3	E-PL5		E-PL6	E-PL7		E-PL8	E-PL9		E-PL10						
Olympus	Rangefinder style PEN	Entry-level					E-PM1		E-PM2														
Olympus	remote													Air									
OM System	SLR style	Professional																	OM-1 ^{R}		OM-1 II ^{R}		
OM System	SLR style	High-end																				OM-3 ^{R}	
OM System	SLR style	Advanced																		OM-5 ^{R}			OM-5 II ^{R}
OM System	PEN	Mid-range																	E-P7				
Panasonic	SLR style	High-end Video													GH5S				GH6 ^{R}			GH7 ^{R}	
Panasonic	SLR style	High-end Photo													G9 ^{R}						G9 II ^{R}		
Panasonic	SLR style	High-end		GH1		GH2			GH3		GH4				GH5				GH5II				
Panasonic	SLR style	Mid-range		G1	G2		G3		G5		G6		G7	G80/G85			G90/G95						
Panasonic	SLR style	Entry-level			G10													G100			G100D		
Panasonic	Rangefinder style	Advanced							GX1		GX7		GX8		GX9								
Panasonic	Rangefinder style	Mid-range									GM1	GM5	GX80/GX85										
Panasonic	Rangefinder style	Entry-level			GF1	GF2	GF3		GF5		GF6	GF7	GF8	GX800/GX850/GF9		GX880/GF10/GF90							
Panasonic	Camcorder	Professional							AG-AF104														
Kodak	Rangefinder style	Entry-level										S-1											
DJI	Drone	.												Zenmuse X5S									
DJI	Drone	.												Zenmuse X5									
YI	Rangefinder style	Entry-level												M1									
Yongnuo	Rangefinder style	Android camera															YN450M		YN455				
Blackmagic Design	Rangefinder style	High-End Video							Cinema Camera														
Blackmagic Design	Rangefinder style	High-End Video									Pocket Cinema Camera					Pocket Cinema Camera 4K							
Blackmagic Design		High-End Video										Micro Cinema Camera									Micro Studio Camera 4K G2		
Z CAM	Cinema	Advanced											E1			E2							
Z CAM	Cinema	Mid-Range																E2-M4					
Z CAM	Cinema	Entry-Level															E2C						
JVC	Camcorder	Professional										GY-LS300											
SVS-Vistek		Industrial							EVO Tracer														
