= Half-frame camera =

Camera, uses the original silent film cinema format 18 × 24 mm

An Olympus Pen F half-frame SLR

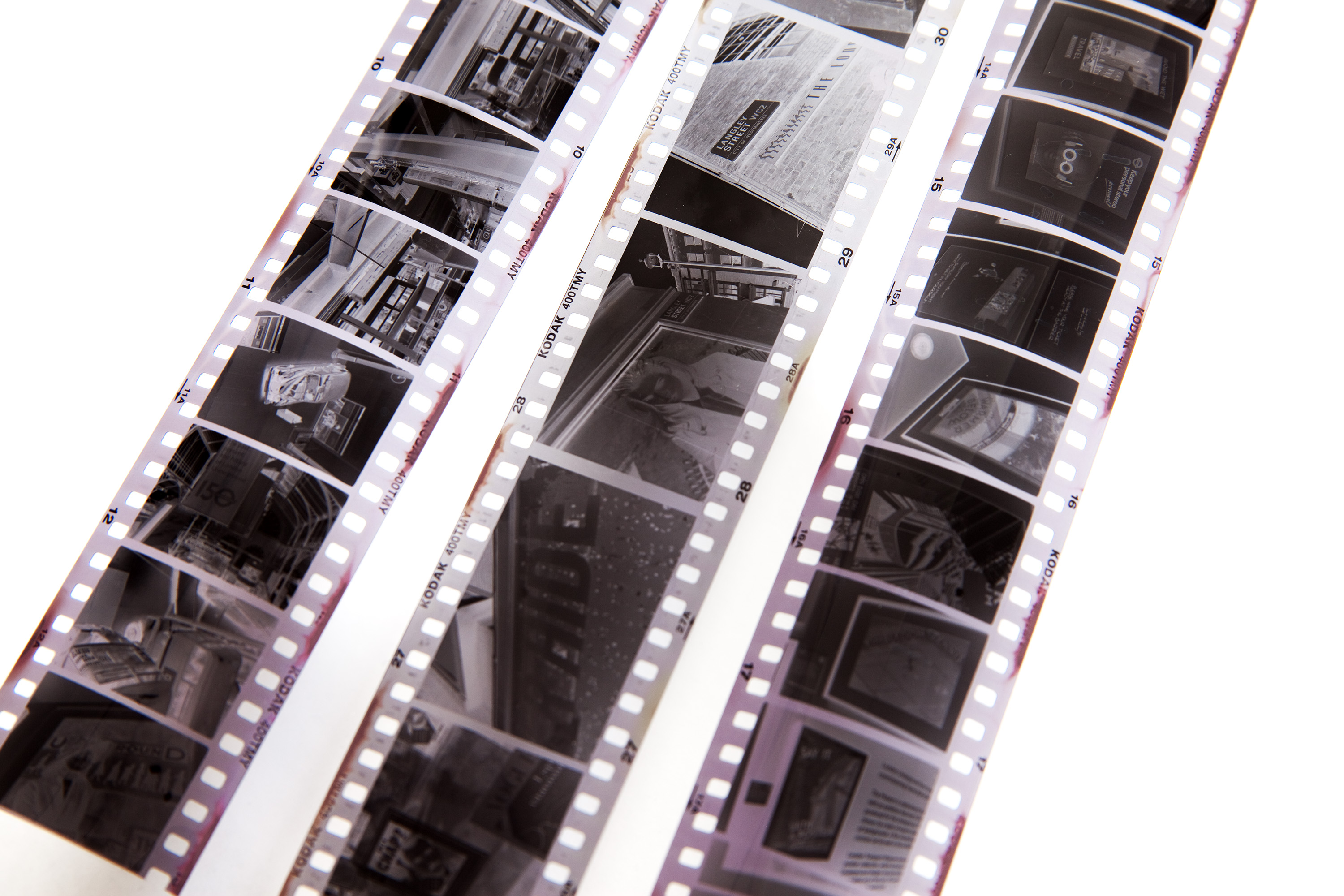
Half-frame film (left and right) with standard 35 mm (centre)

Half-frame cameras, also called single-frame or split-frame cameras, are film cameras compatible with 35mm film types. These cameras capture congruent shots that take up half of each individual frame in the roll of film. They can be still frame or motion picture cameras and are the standard format of 35mm movie cameras. This is commonly expressed, more technically, as 18×24 mm using 18×24 mm of a regular 135 film. It is closer to the normal frame size of a 35 mm motion film. This leaves half frame cameras to derive their film plate size from the aspect ratio, and frame size that was first designated by Thomas Edison (24.89 by 18.67 millimetres or 0.980 by 0.735 inches) at the dawn of the motion picture industry. Traditionally, the additional film width on motion picture film is used for audio in later film standards, although the original patent for sound on film is derived from the 1880s.

== Overview ==
The usual frame size of 35mm still cameras is 24×36 mm, however half-frame cameras typical use an image area of 18×24 mm. The result of this is that a roll of film can typically contain twice the number of exposures as in a full frame 35mm camera. This means that a roll that is nominally 36 exposures allows 72 in the half-frame format, and a 24-exposure roll allows 48.

These cameras are called "half-frame" as they expose frames half the width of typical 35mm still cameras. The resulting frame is similar in size to that recorded by 35 mm movie cameras.

Half frame became popular as a less expensive alternative to full frame cameras in the 1960s. This was particularly popular in Japan. Among the more popular half frame cameras are the Olympus Pen models. Half frame cameras allowed for more compact cameras to exist alongside full frame cameras, particularly in rangefinder type cameras. Half frame single lens reflex cameras require a smaller mirror than their full frame counterparts. The smaller frame also permitted the use of physically smaller lenses as a smaller image circle was needed. This resulted in far smaller cameras such as the Olympus Pen cameras.

In the 1960s, as half frame cameras grew in popularity with new models such the Kodak Instamatic in 1963, concerns were raised about the true economic benefits. While allowing 72 shots on a standard 36 shot roll was appealing, the reduced image quality made this less appealing. This would also become true for many other formats including 110 film and APS film that attempted to and failed to augment 35 mm film. However unlike APS, as a separate format, half frame survives as it can be shot on standard 35 mm film, which is still widely available.

Due to the fact that half frame cameras use standard 35 mm film stocks, "half frame" continues to exist as a niche photographic format to the present date for diptych photography. The irregular frame markers and its novelty of exposing two frames on one slide or negative has led to the growth of half frame cameras as a diptych format. The diptych format allows photographers to convey meaning through multiple images in one frame.

The default orientation for most half frame cameras is vertical (portrait) as opposed to the horizontal (landscape) orientation of a full frame 35 mm SLR or rangefinder. The exceptions are cameras that use vertically run film mechanisms (examples including the Konica Recorder and Belomo Agat 18). Consumers did not always like having to hold half frame cameras vertically for a horizontal orientation photograph. The half frame camera can be seen as defying traditional camera ergonomics. More recently, social media use has made some see the default portrait orientation as beneficial, particularly with Instagram changing from the 1:1 aspect ratio to 4:5 and 9:16 to fit more image on a mobile device. The 3:4 aspect ratio of half frame photos can easily be cropped to 4:5 in portrait orientation without a significant reduction in image quality producing an "Instagram ready" photo. This has been reinforced by Kodak's reintroduction of half frame cameras through the Kodak Ektar branded H35 half frame camera.

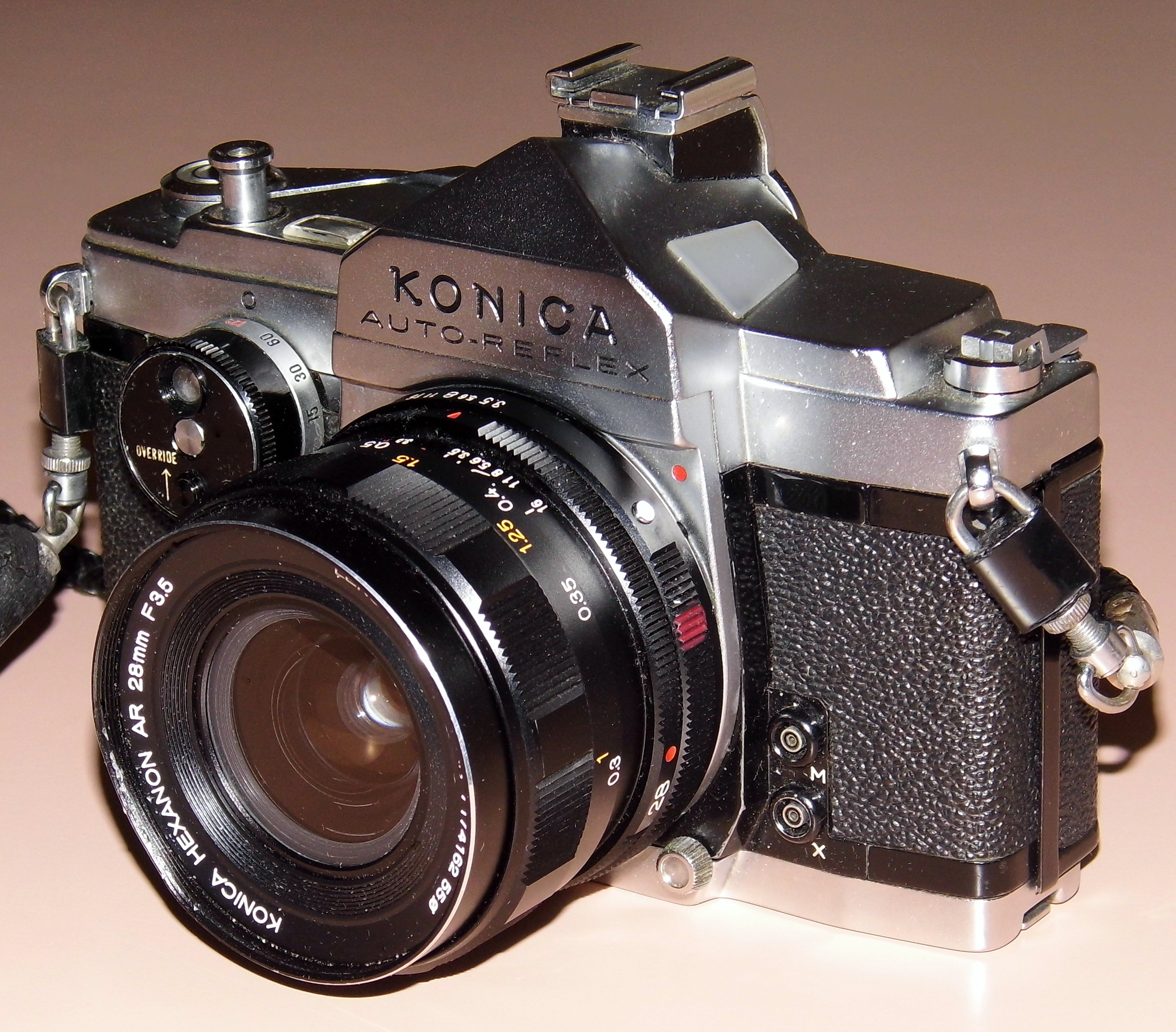
A Konica Auto Reflex full/half-frame SLR, with hot shoe "eye piece" adapter attached for electronic X flash cable attached units or manual bulbs.

Technologically, the most advanced electronic half-frame camera is the Yashica Samurai single lens reflex. The earlier Olympus PEN and Konica Auto Reflex reached a pinnacle for mechanical half frame cameras by offering fully functional rangefinder and SLR styled options such as the Olympus Pen, Rangefinder style, and SLR style options respectively such as the Konica Autoreflex known in the international market, and marketed as the Autorex (Japan) and Revue Auto-Reflex (Europe). These cameras remain popular among film shooters today.

The Konica Auto Reflex can also switch between full and half frame while shooting. The Auto Reflex SLR gives access to the full Konica AR lens library in half frame, and additionally Nikon F, M42, and Leica M mount with adapters under the provision of stop down metering. Konica at the time created a camera with some deliberation, so that due to its lens flange register, and therefore mount distance, it could be used by photographers from other brand manufacturers with simple lens mount adapters.

Some cameras originally designed for use as full-frame cameras were produced or custom modified in very small production runs as half-frame models for specific purposes. Examples of these include Leica (1950 made in Canada Leica 72), Nikon (1960–61 Nikon S3M 18x24mm rangefinder, Nikon FM2 SLR), Konica (FT-1 Pro Half) or Robot (Robot 24x24mm camera) rangefinders, and some Alpa (Alpa 18x24 SLR) and Minolta SLRs. These limited production run cameras are mainly of interest as collectibles. Due to scarcity value these cameras attract more value as a stock commodity than as a commonly used camera. In other cases, the smaller size of the cameras at the time, coupled with the increase in image quality saw half frame as a viable replacement option for the 110 film format.
