= Olympus Pen F =

35 mm film single-lens reflex camera

- Olympus Pen F with 40mm f1.4

Overview
- Maker: Olympus
- Type: SLR (Half frame)
- Released: 1963 Pen F, 1966 Pen FT, 1967 Pen FV
- Production: 1963-1972 (1963-1966 Pen F, 1966-1972 Pen FT and 1967-1970 Pen FV)

Lens
- Lens mount: Olympus Pen F mount

Sensor/medium
- Recording medium: 135 film

Focusing
- Focus: Manual focus

Exposure/metering
- Exposure: Manual

Shutter
- Frame rate: manually wound
- Shutter speed range: 1 s – 1/500 s; Bulb

General
- Dimensions: 130×71×36 mm (5.1×2.8×1.4 in)
- Made in: Japan

The Olympus Pen F, Pen FT and Pen FV are very similar half-frame 35 mm single-lens reflex (SLR) cameras with interchangeable lenses produced by Olympus of Japan between 1963-1966 (Pen F), 1966-1972 (Pen FT) and 1967-1970 (Pen FV).

== History ==
The original Pen F has a double-stroke film advance and a distinctive logo rendered in a gothic font. The later Pen FT added a single-stroke film advance, and an uncoupled, integrated light meter, which uses a system of exposure numbers rather than f-stops. The exposure numbers were added to the aperture rings of later Pen F lenses; the rings could be pulled out and rotated to show conventional f-stops instead. A side-effect of the FT's light meter was a dimmer viewfinder. The Pen FV was essentially a Pen FT without the light meter and with the brighter viewfinder of the Pen F.

Half frame means that the camera uses an 18×24 mm vertical (portrait) format, producing twice the pictures on a roll of 135 film as the regular 36×24 mm format. The smaller image format also allows for a smaller camera and lenses, making the Pen F system one of the smallest SLR systems ever made; the Pentax Auto 110 was smaller, but with a much more limited range of lenses and accessories, and smaller 110 film.

These cameras are somewhat exceptional since they used a rotary focal-plane shutter, rather than the two-curtain focal-plane shutter commonly used in other SLRs at that time. Since this one-piece shutter opens fully before it starts to close, it can synchronize to electronic flash at all shutter speeds.

Pen-F series cameras are occasionally modified to mount standard motion picture camera lenses for use as film test cameras with 35mm motion picture films. The Pen-F frame size is close to the 35mm motion picture Super 35 frame.

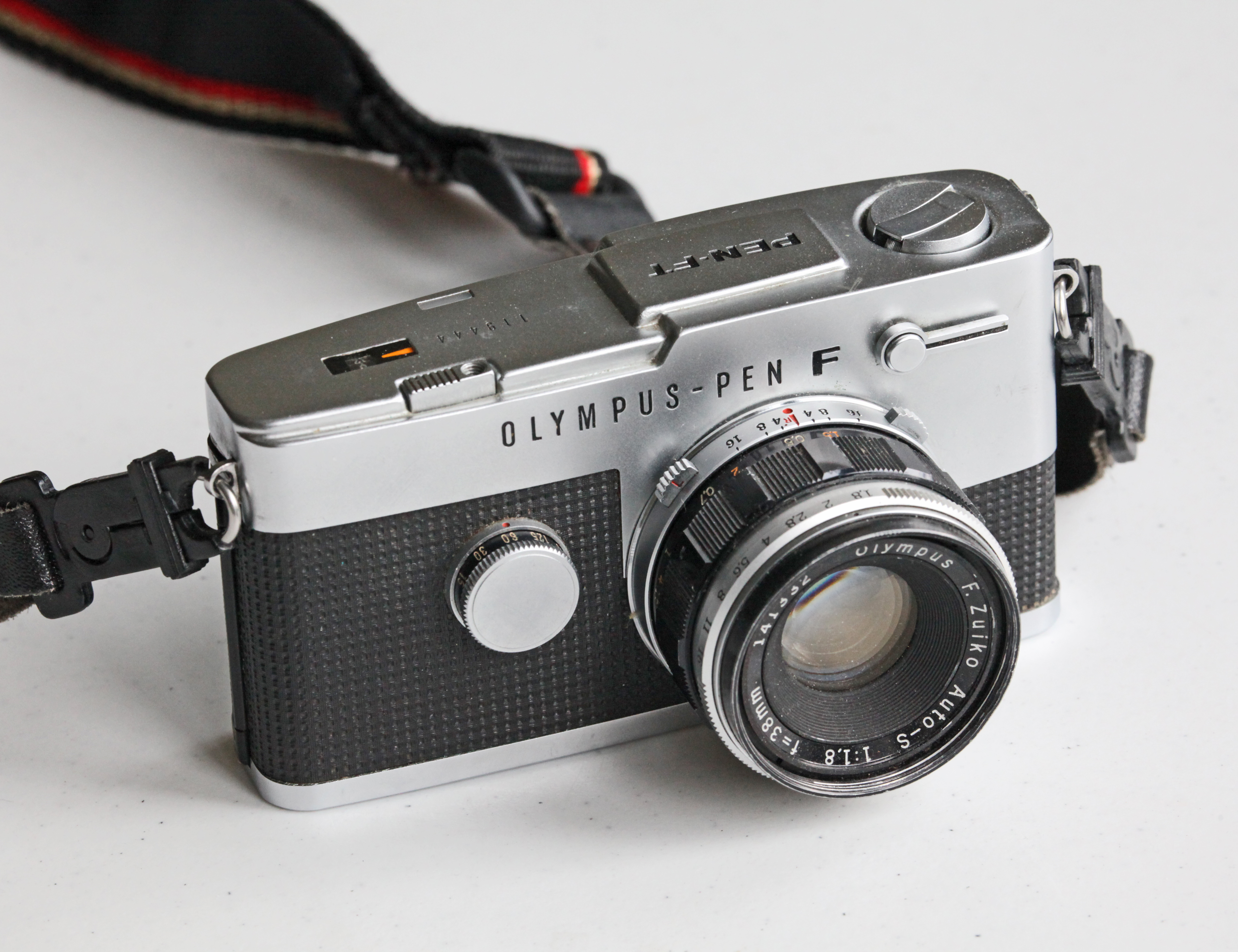
Olympus Pen FT with 38mm f/1.8 lens

== Lenses manufactured for the Olympus Pen F System ==
Type	Lens	Foc.Leng.(mm) F	35mm equiv.	Angle of view	Gr.-El.	TTL-No.	F/stop range	Min. Focus	Filter	Weight
Wide	G.Zuiko Auto-W	20mm F3.5	28mm	73°	6-7	0-4	3.5–16	0.2m	43mm	145g
Wide	E.Zuiko Auto-W	25mm F4	35mm	62°	5-5	0-4	4–16	0.25m	43mm	120g
Wide	G.Zuiko Auto-W	25mm F2.8	35mm	62°	5-7	0-5	2.8–16	0.25m	43mm	160g
Standard	F.Zuiko Auto-S	38mm F1.8	55mm	43°	5-6	0-6	1.8–16	0.35m	43mm	135g
Standard	E.Zuiko Auto-S (“pancake”)	38mm F2.8	55mm	43°	4-5	0-5	2.8–16	0.8m	43mm	70g
Standard	D.Zuiko Auto-S	38mm F2.8	55mm	43°	3-4	0-5	2.8–16	0.35m	43mm	125g
Standard	G.Zuiko Auto-S	40mm F1.4	58mm	41°	6-7	0-6	1.4–16	0.35m	43mm	165g
Standard	H.Zuiko Auto-S	42mm F1.2	60mm	39°	6-8	0-6	1.2–16	0.35m	49mm	255g
Telephoto	G.Zuiko Auto-T	60mm F1.5	85mm	28°	5-7	0-6	1.5–16	0.8m	49mm	270g
Telephoto	F.Zuiko Auto-T	70mm F2	100mm	24°	5-6	0.5-7	2–22	0.8m	43mm	230g
Telephoto	E.Zuiko Auto-T	100mm F3.5	140mm	17°	4-5	1-6	3.5–22	1.5m	43mm	250g
Telephoto	E.Zuiko Auto-T	150mm F4	210mm	12°	4-5	1-5	4–22	1.7m	49mm	380g
Super Telephoto	E.Zuiko T	250mm F5	360mm	7°	3-5	1-6	5–32*M	3.5m	58mm	800g
Super Telephoto	E.Zuiko T	400mm F6.3	570mm	4°	4-5	1-5	6.3–32*M	5m	72mm	1750g
Super Telephoto	Zuiko Mirror T	800mm F8	1150mm	2°	4-5	-	8	16m	25.5mm	2400g
Zoom	Zuiko Auto-Zoom	50–90mm F3.5	70–130mm	34–19°	8-10	0.5-4	3.5–16	1.5m	49mm	420g
Zoom	Zuiko Zoom	100–200mm F5	140–280mm	17-9°	9-12	1-6	5–32*M	1.7m	49mm	700g
Macro	E.Zuiko Auto-Macro	38mm F3.5	55mm	43°	4-5	0-4	3.5–16	0.156m	43mm	200g

- *M=manual diaphragm
