= OM-1 =

OM-1 may refer to one of the following cameras:

- OM System OM-1, a mirrorless digital camera, made by the "OM Digital Solutions"
- Olympus OM-1, a SLR film camera made by the Japanese company Olympus in the 1970s to 1980s
