= Sony Vaio SVT series =

Series of tablet computers

The Sony Vaio SVT series was a series of tablet PCs that Sony Corporation sold during 2013 till the selling of their PC business to Japan Industrial Partners.

== Models ==
Model	Color	Display	Processor	Memory	Storage Drive	Operating System
SVT11213CXB	Black	11.6" Triluminos LED display, 1920x1080	Intel Pentium 3560Y	4GB DDR3L	128 GB SSD	Windows 8
SVT11213CXW	White	11.6" Triluminos LED display, 1920x1080	Intel Pentium 3560Y	4GB DDR3L	128 GB SSD	Windows 8
SVT11215CXB	Black	11.6" Triluminos LED display, 1920x1080	Intel Core i5-4210Y	4GB DDR3L	128 GB SSD	Windows 8
SVT11215CXW	White	11.6" Triluminos LED display, 1920x1080	Intel Core i5-4210Y	4GB DDR3L	128 GB SSD	Windows 8
