= OM3 =

OM3 may refer to:

- Olympus OM-3, a film camera released in 1983
- OM System OM-3, a digital camera released in 2025
- OM3, a type of multi-mode optical fiber
