= OM Digital Solutions =

Japanese optical products company

OM Digital Solutions Corporation
- Native name: OMデジタルソリューションズ
- Type: Public (K.K)
- Industry: Electronics
- Founded: October 9, 2020; 5 years ago
- Founder: Olympus Corporation
- Headquarters: Shinjuku, Tokyo, Japan
- Area served: Worldwide
- Key people: Shigemi Sugimoto (CEO)
- Products: Cameras, Camera lenses, voice recorders
- Brands: OM System; Zuiko; Olympus
- Owner: OJ Holdings, Ltd
- Number of employees: c. 2,000 (2021)
- Website: https://www.om-digitalsolutions.com

OM Digital Solutions Corporation (OMDS) (OMデジタルソリューションズ) is a Japanese manufacturer of opto-digital products for business and consumer use, branded OM System. The company acquired the camera, audio recorder and binocular product divisions of the manufacturer Olympus in January 2021.

OM System is the camera brand of OM Digital Solutions.

== History ==
On 30 September 2020, Olympus announced that it had entered into an agreement with financial investor Japan Industrial Partners (JIP) to transfer the Olympus Imaging division to a newly established wholly owned subsidiary of Olympus. This subsidiary was named OM Digital Solutions. On 1 January 2021, 95% of the shares in OM Digital Solutions were transferred to OJ Holdings, Ltd, a specially established subsidiary of JIP. Olympus retained ownership of the remaining 5%.

In 2021, OM Digital Solutions reported that all its products would be rebranded from Olympus to OM System. The new name is a reference to the Olympus OM system.

In April 2026, current CEO Shigemi Sugimoto acquired majority ownership of the company.

== Products ==
Initially, the company continued production of products that were launched under Olympus ownership. The first product launched by the newly formed company was the Olympus PEN E-P7 in June 2021. In February 2022, OMDS introduced the OM System OM-1 Micro Four Thirds camera to celebrate the 50th anniversary of the original Olympus OM-1. In November 2022 OMDS released the OM System OM-5, a successor to the Olympus OM-D E-M5 Mark III, and in February 2025 introduced the OM System OM-3, a retro-styled Micro Four Thirds camera with the same sensor as the OM-1 Mark II.

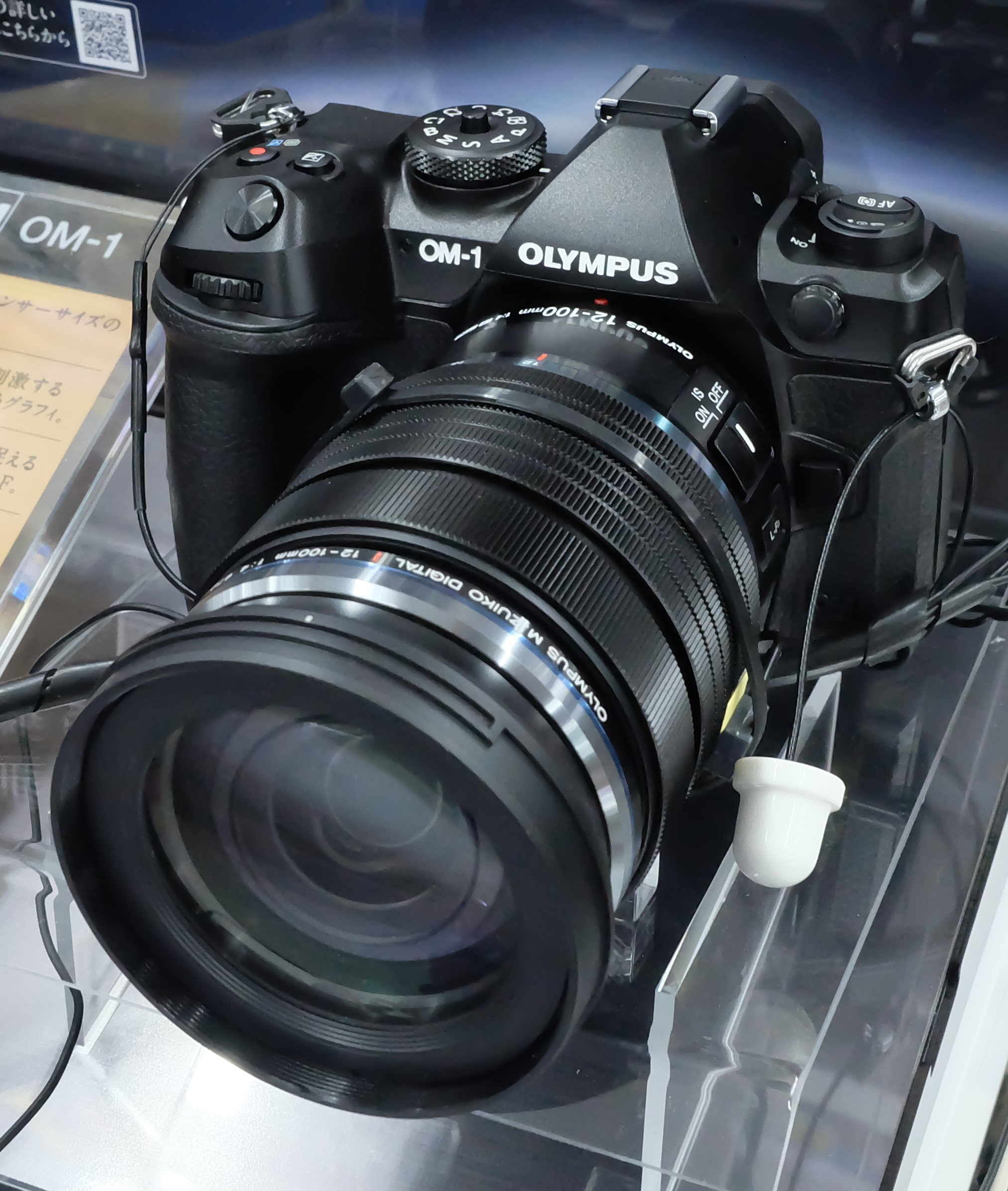
OM System OM-1

OM System OM-1 Mark II

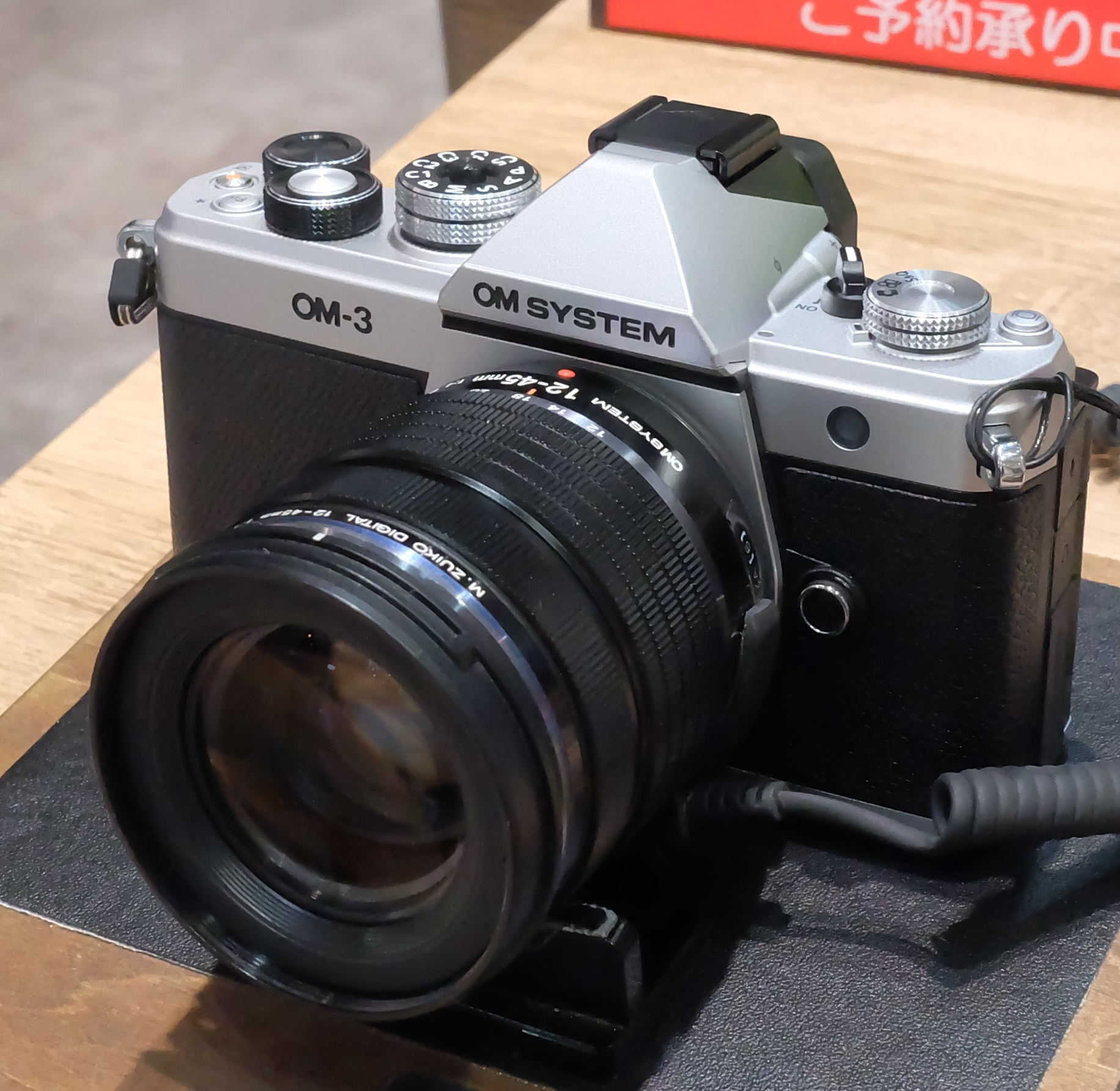
OM System OM-3

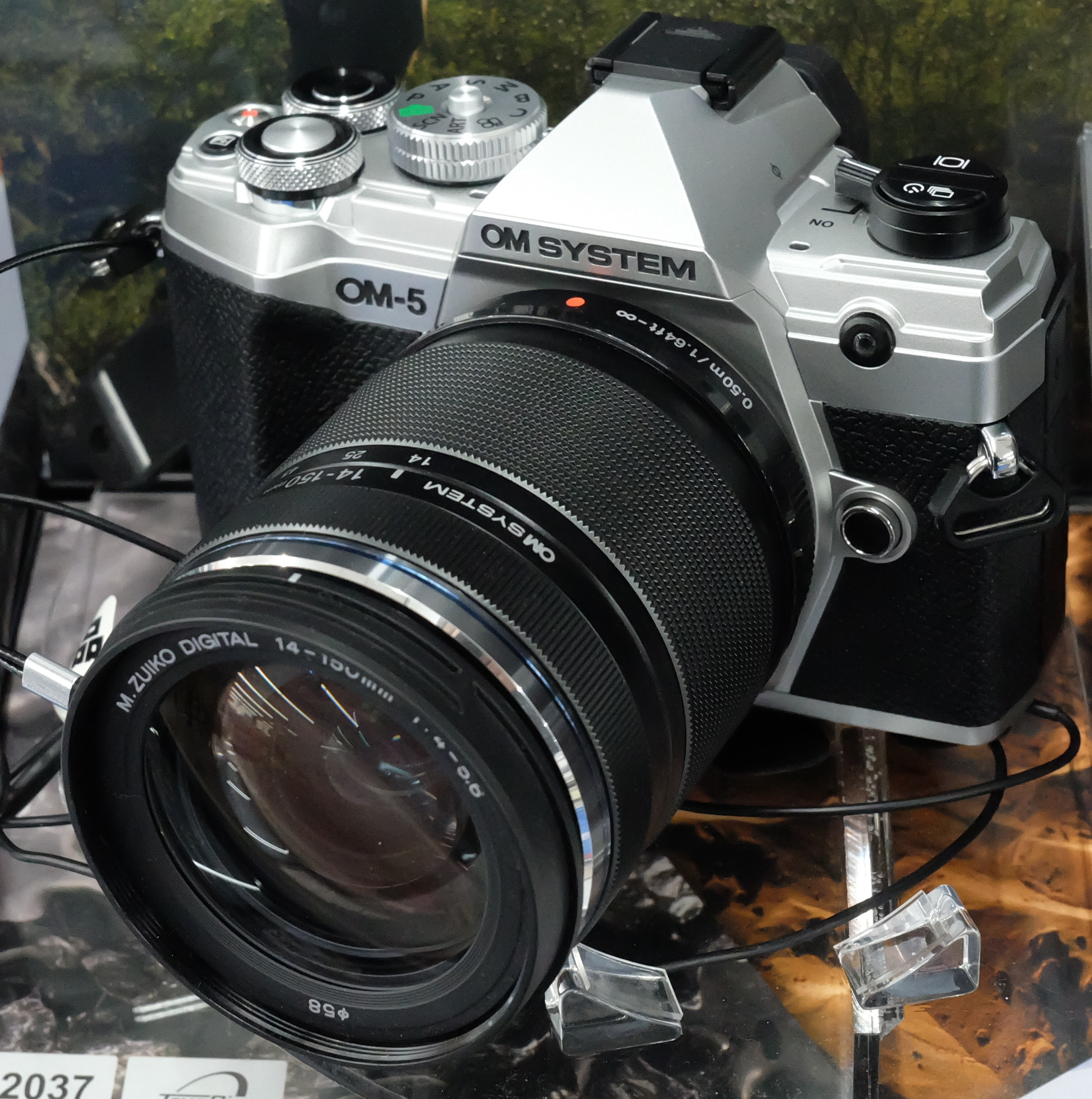
OM System OM-5

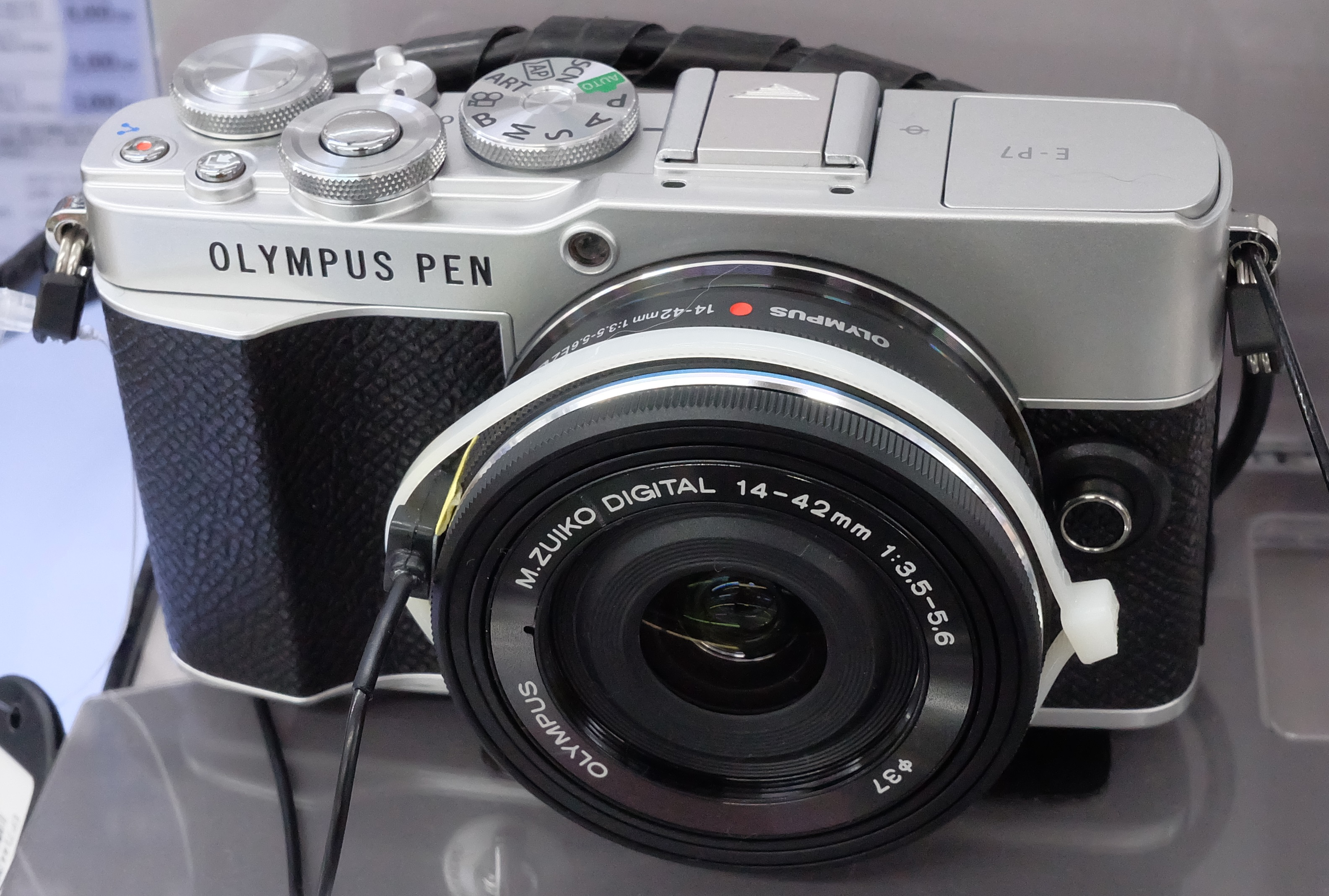
Olympus PEN E-P7
