= OM System OM-3 =

Mirrorless interchangeable-lens camera

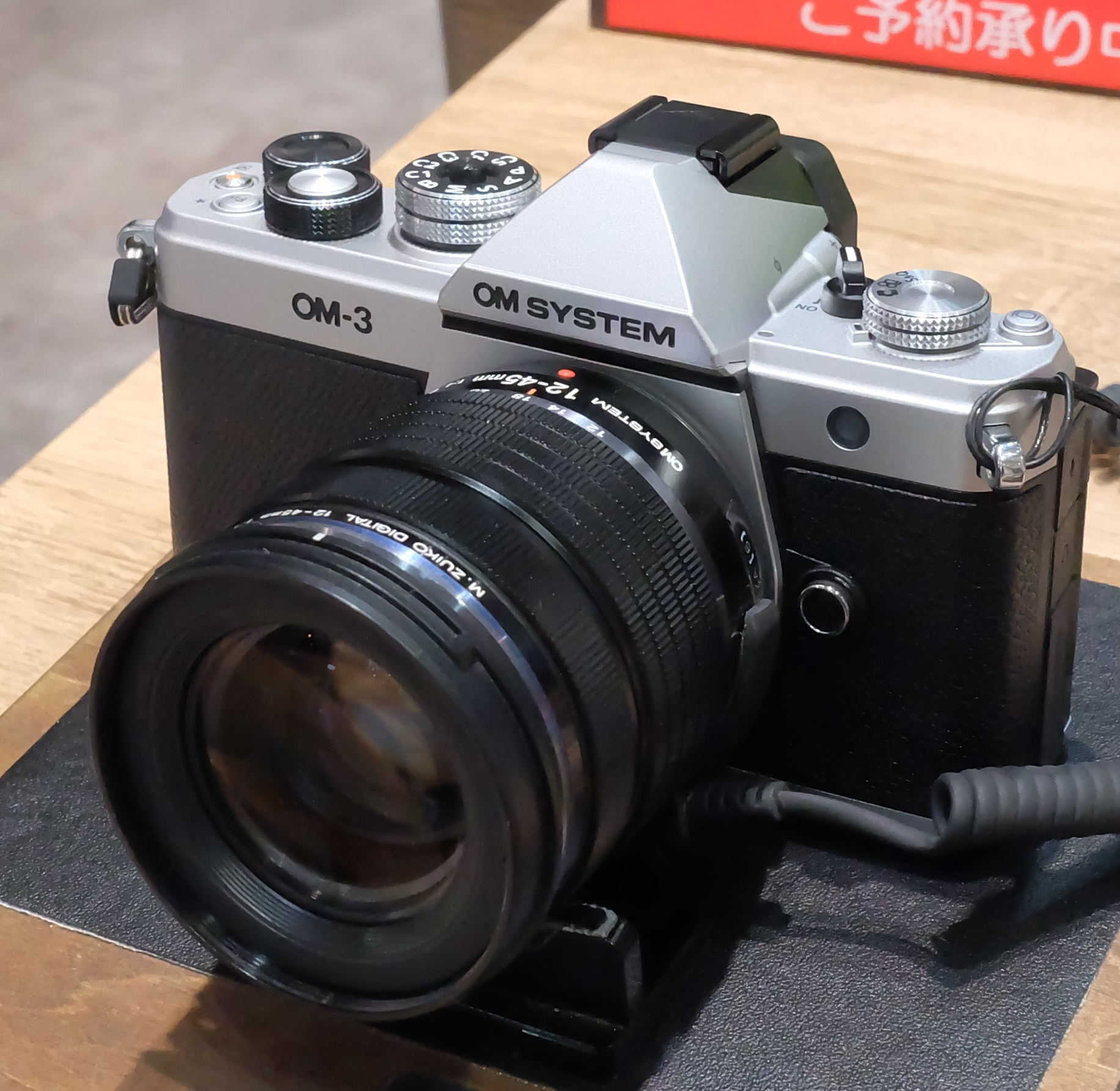
- OM System OM-3 + M.Zuiko Digital 12-45mm F4.0 Pro

Overview
- Maker: OM Digital Solutions
- Type: Mirrorless camera
- Released: March 1, 2025; 19 months ago
- Intro price: US$1,999 ¥264,000 body only

Lens
- Lens mount: Micro Four Thirds
- Compatible lenses: Micro Four Thirds lenses from all manufacturers, including OM System (Olympus), Panasonic, and others

Sensor/medium
- Sensor: Exmor RS IMX472
- Sensor type: Stacked BSI CMOS (branded Live MOS)
- Sensor size: 17.3×13mm (Four Thirds type)
- Sensor maker: Sony
- Maximum resolution: 5184×3888 (20.4 megapixels)
- Recording medium: SDXC UHS-II memory card slot

Focusing
- Focus: Quad Pixel on-sensor phase-detection AF
- Focus areas: 1053 points

Flash
- Flash: No built-in flash
- Compatible flashes: Olympus, Panasonic, and other Micro Four Thirds flash units

Shutter
- Frame rate: 50 fps with continuous autofocus 120 fps with single autofocus
- Shutter speed range: 1/8000s−60s
- Continuous shooting: 10 fps with mechanical shutter 50 or 120 fps with blackout-free electronic shutter

Viewfinder
- Electronic viewfinder: Built-in OLED, 2.36M dots
- Frame coverage: 100%

Image processing
- Image processor: Truepic X

General
- Video recording: Up to 4K UHD at 60 fps
- LCD screen: 1.62M dots vari-angle touchscreen
- Battery: BLX-1 (USB-PD rechargeable)
- AV port(s): HDMI Type-D; 3.5mm stereo microphone and headphone jacks
- Data port(s): USB 3.0 Type-C; Wi-Fi 5 and Bluetooth Low Energy
- Body features: In-body image stabilization, IP53 weather sealing
- Dimensions: 139 mm × 89 mm × 46 mm (5.5 in × 3.5 in × 1.8 in) (WHD)
- Weight: 496 g (17.5 oz) with battery
- Made in: Vietnam

Chronology
- Predecessor: OM System OM-1 Mark II

The OM System OM-3 is a retro-styled mirrorless interchangeable-lens camera produced by OM Digital Solutions on the Micro Four Thirds system. It is styled on the original Olympus OM-1 35mm camera. It is the first new product line introduced by OM System after its acquisition of the imaging divisions of the camera manufacturer Olympus in 2021.

The OM-3 was announced on the 6th of February 2025. It includes the same 20.4MP stacked sensor found in the flagship OM System OM-1 Mark II, though only one SD card slot. It features a Creative Dial as found on the Digital PEN-F cameras for choosing colour modes and filters, and is weather sealed to IP53 standards.

== Features ==
- 20 Megapixel Four Thirds Stacked CMOS sensor
- In-body image stabilization (IBIS) rated up to 6.5EV
- 2.36M dot EVF 0.69x magnification
- Up to 50 frame per second continuous shooting with C-AF, 120fps with AF/AE locked
- Configurable pre-capture mode
- Up to 4K 60p video with 10-bit Log option
- Dedicated color and effects dial
- IP53-rated weather sealing
- 50MP handheld / 80MP tripod high-res composite shooting mode
- 590 shots per battery charge

The OM-3 originally retailed for a MSRP of $1,999 (body-only) and $2,299 as a kit with the 12-45mm F4.0 Pro lens. The camera received the Silver Award from the photography web site Digital Photography Review (DP Review).

== Gallery ==
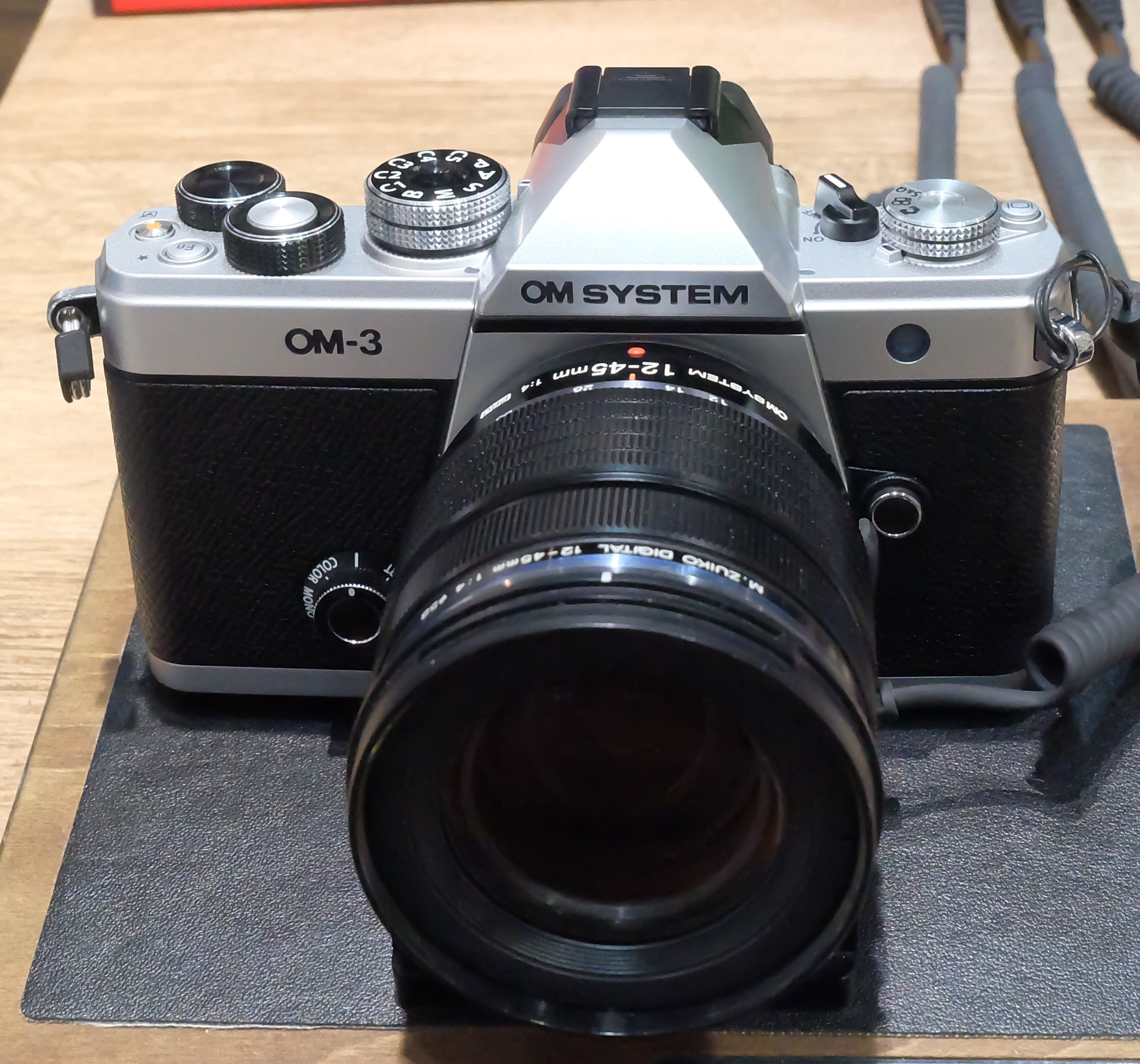

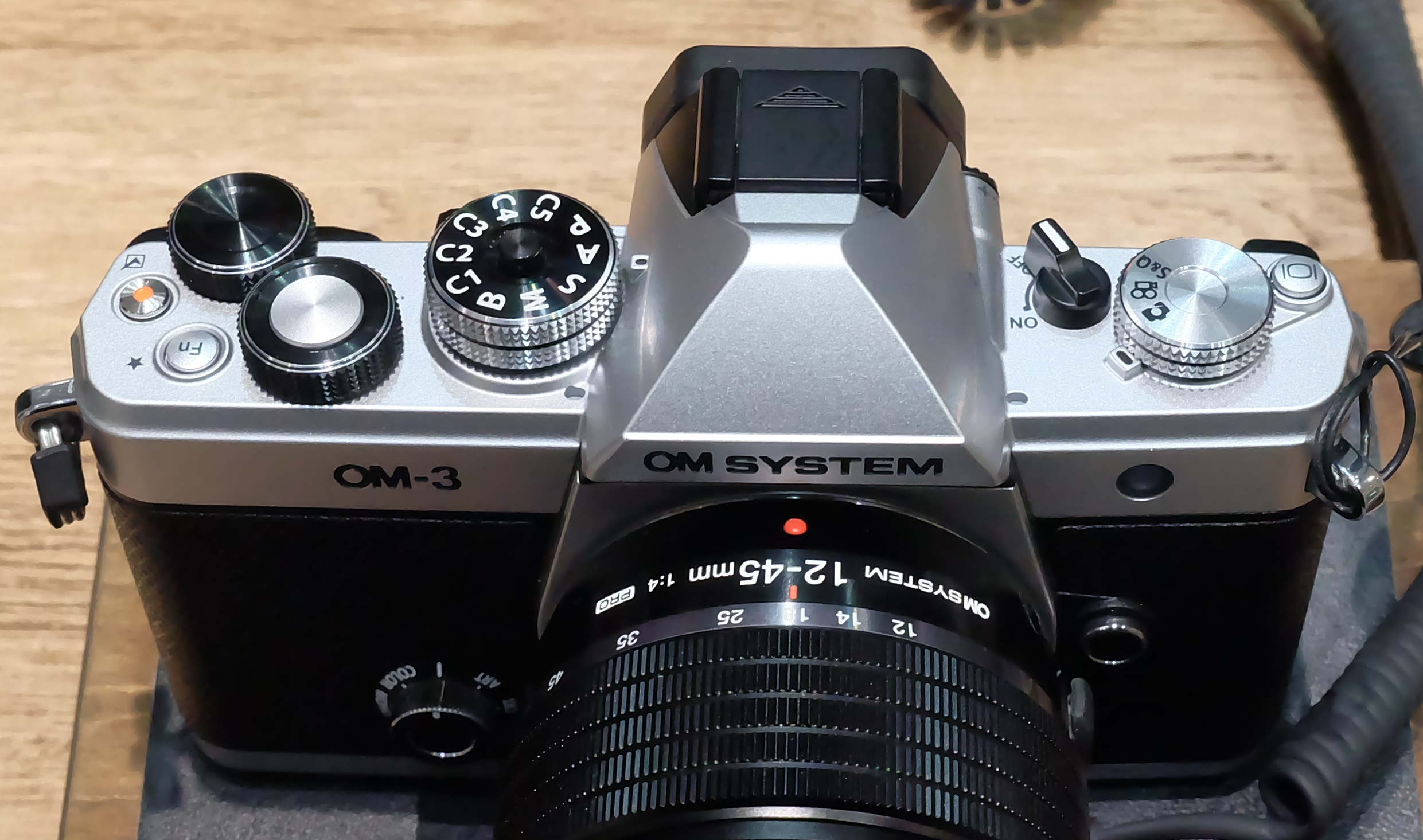

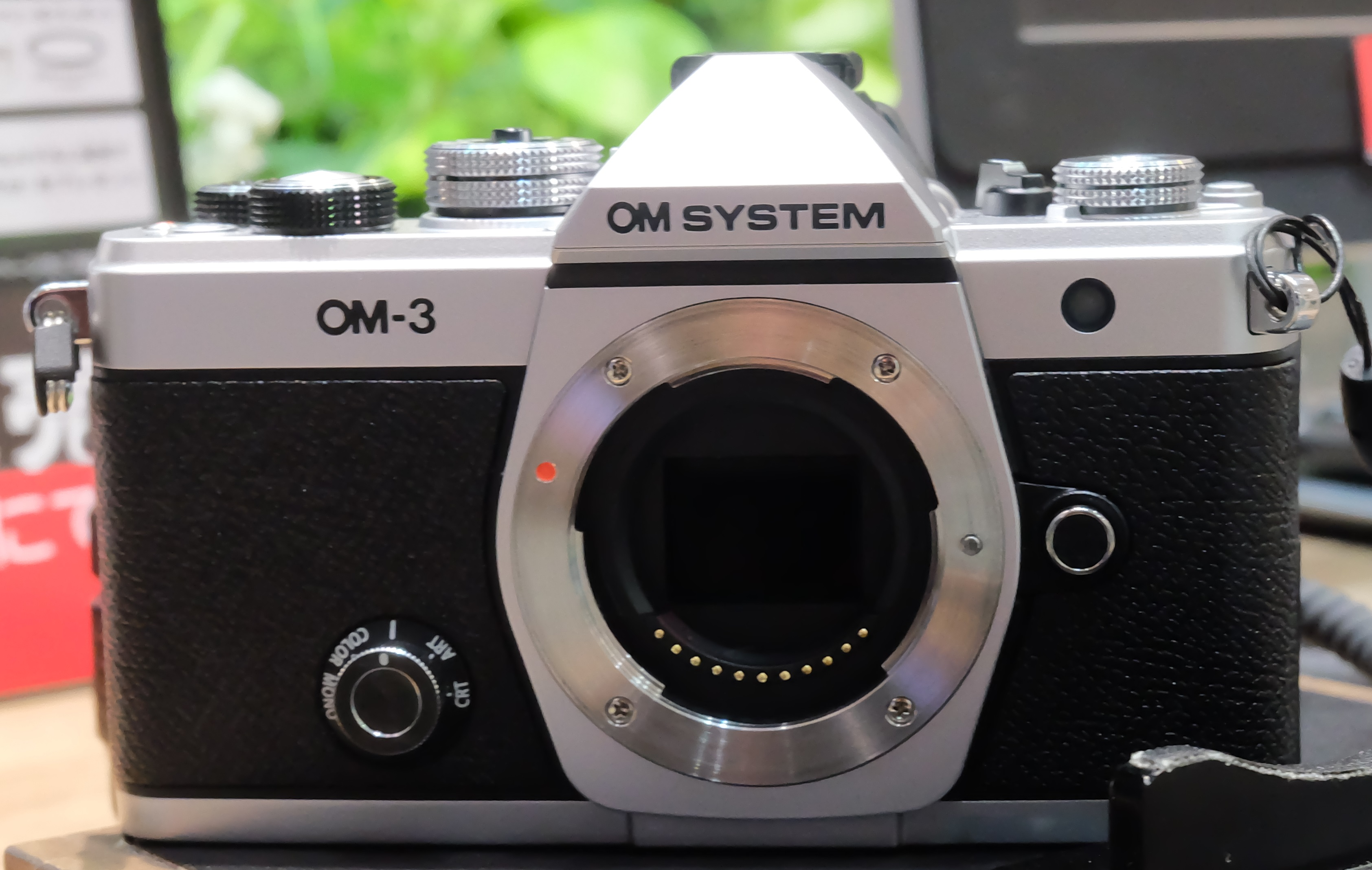

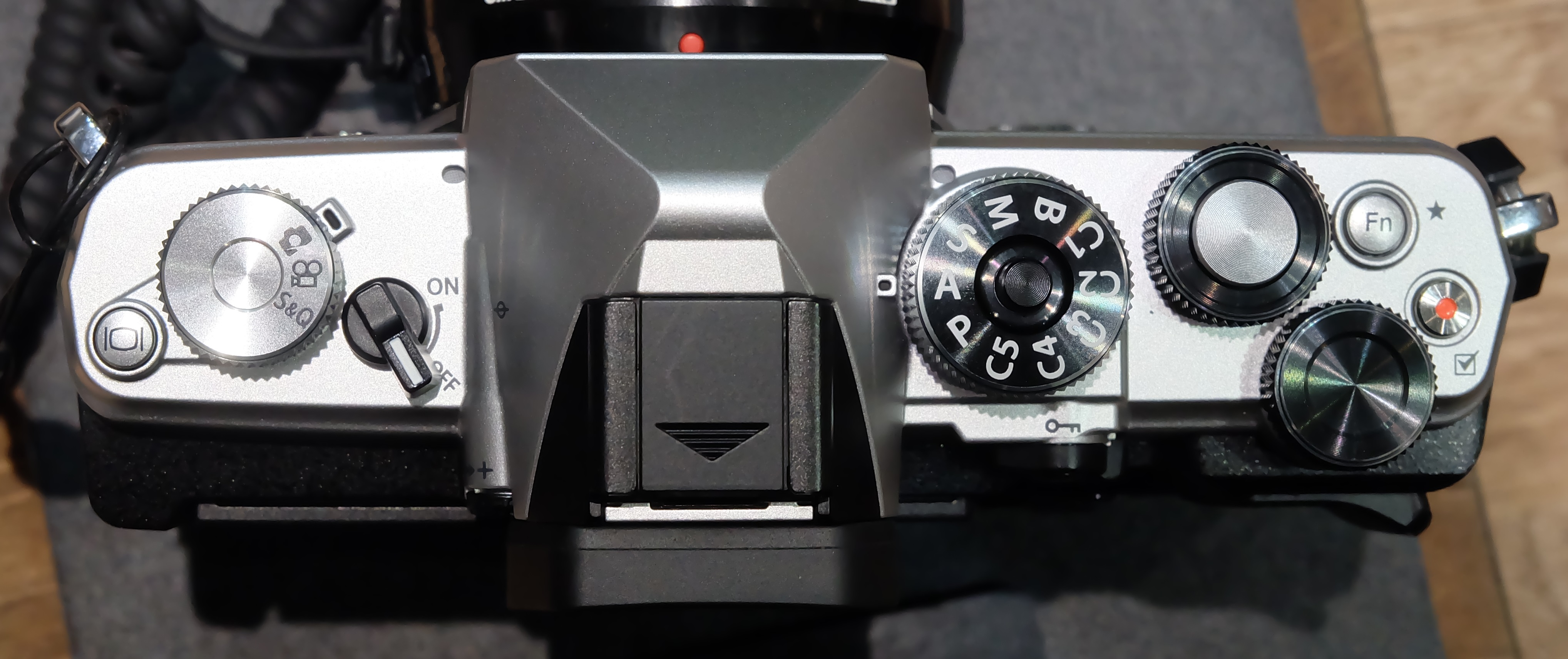

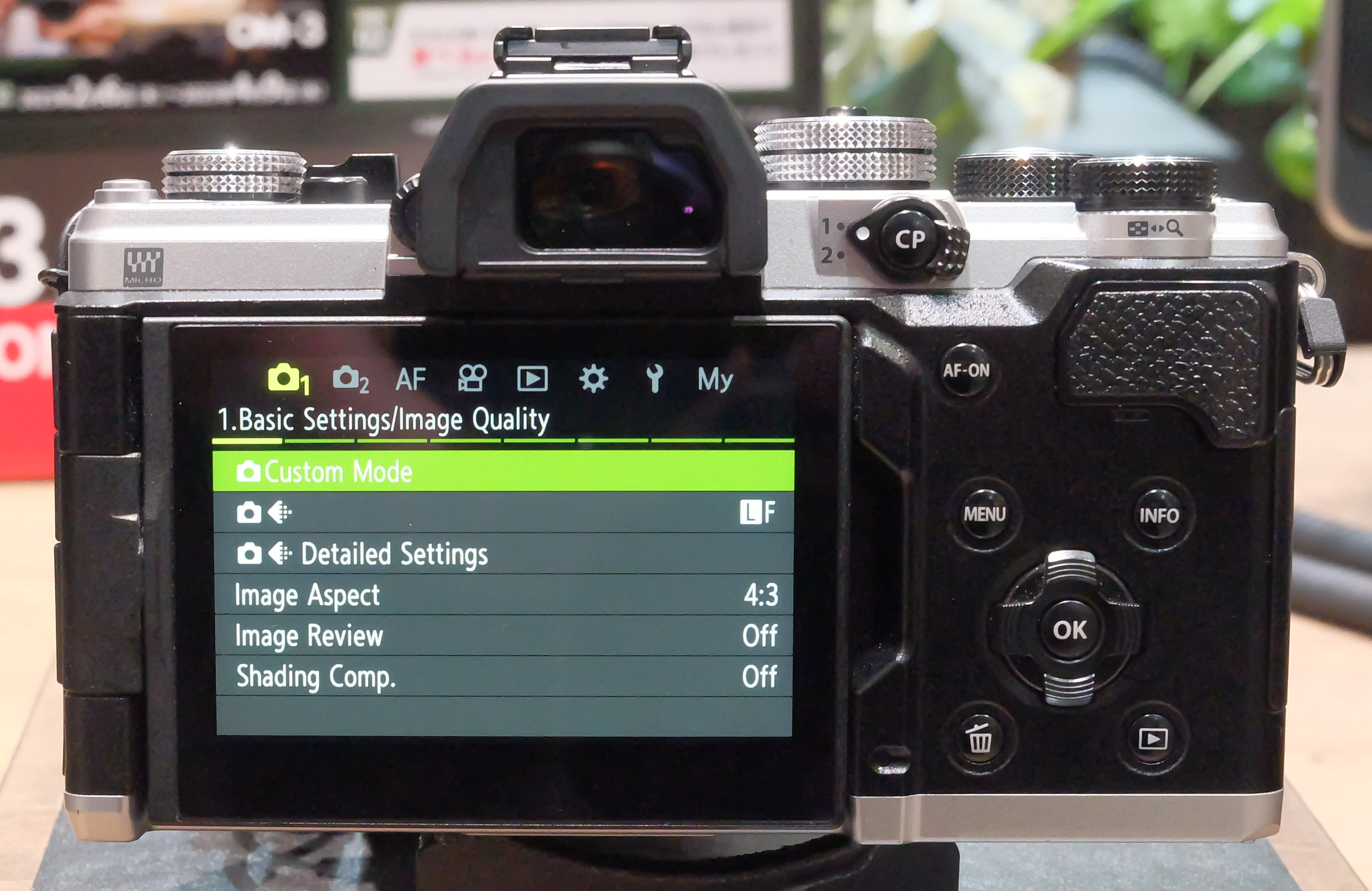

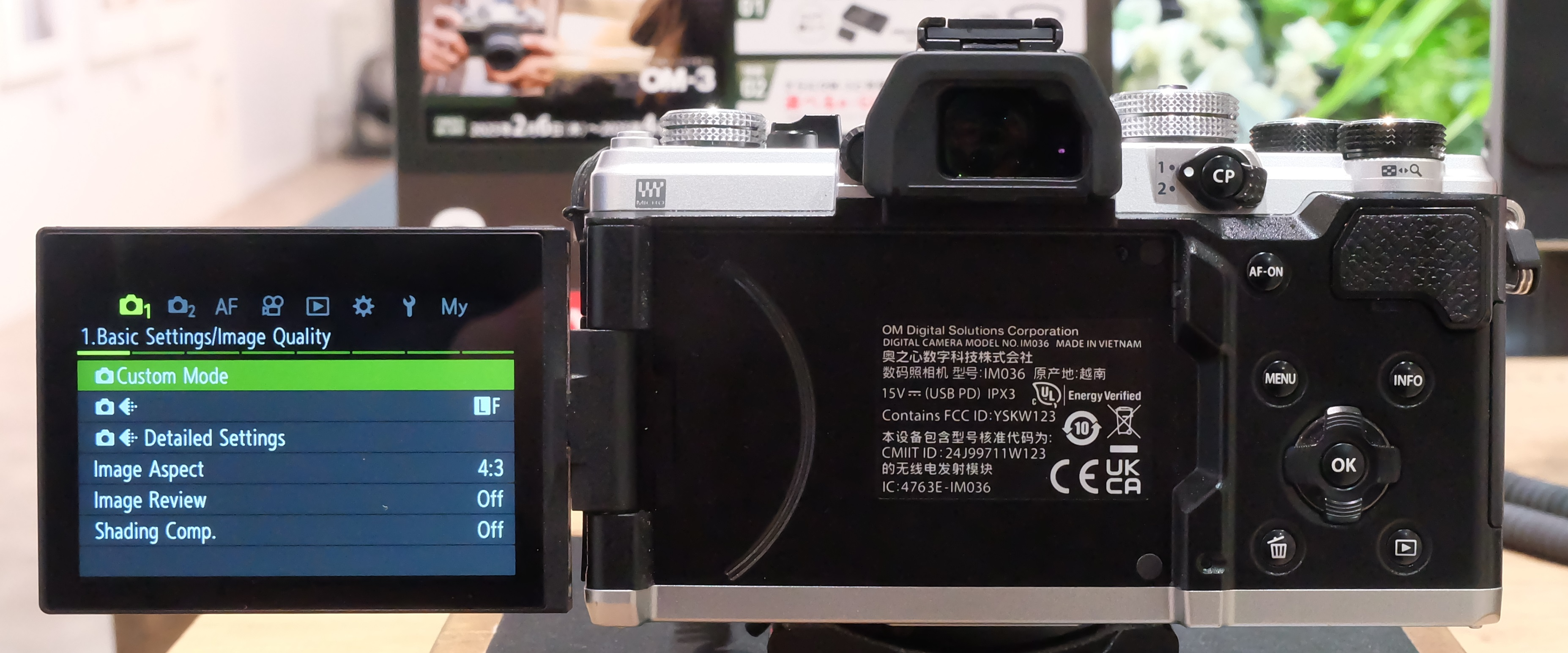

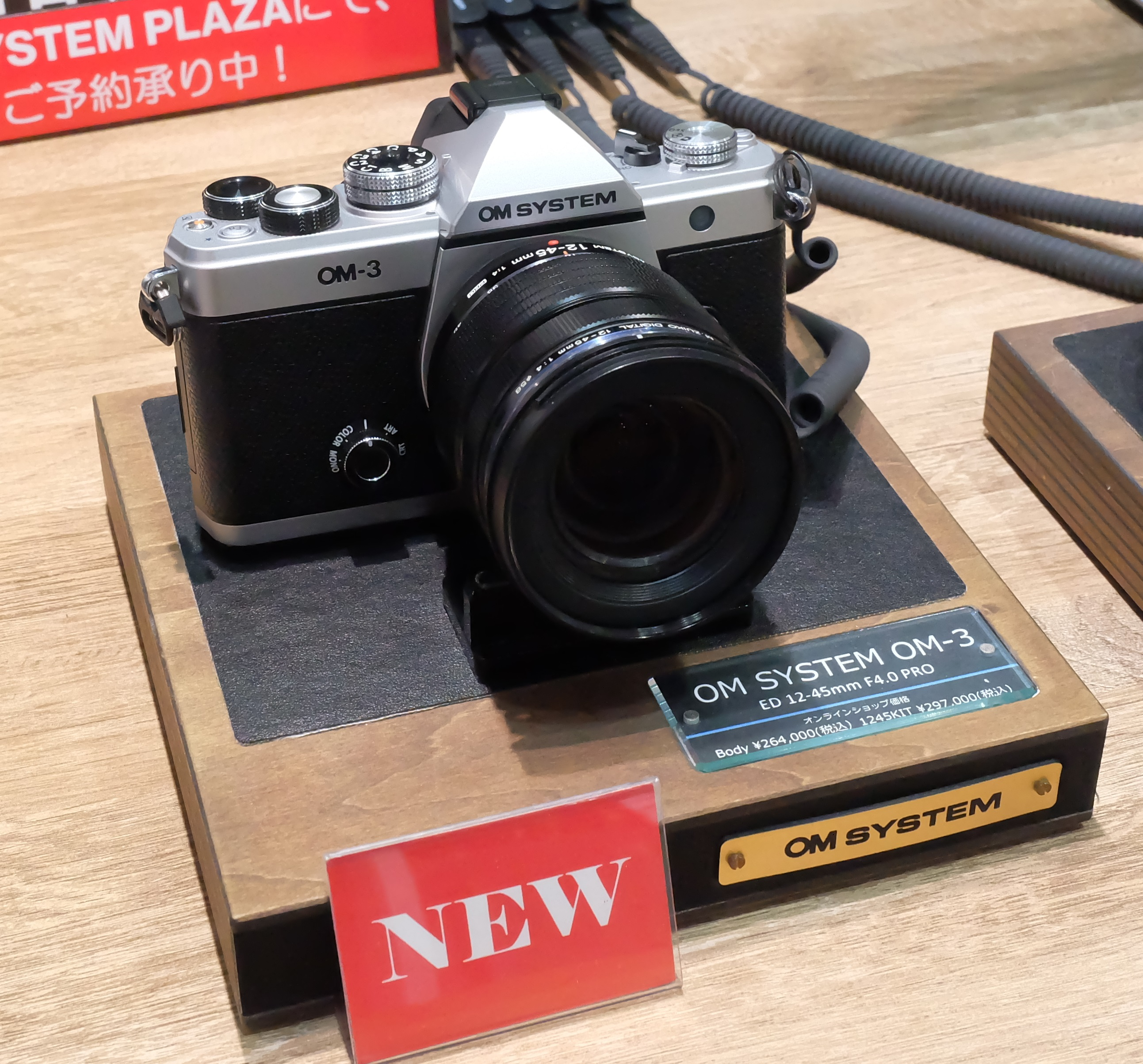

Brand	Form	Class	2008	2009	2010	2011			2012	2013	2014	2015	2016	2017	2018	2019	2020	2021	2022	2023	2024	2025	2026
Olympus	SLR style OM-D	Professional															E-M1X ^{R}						
Olympus	SLR style OM-D	High-end									E-M1			E-M1 II ^{R}			E-M1 III ^{R}						
Olympus	SLR style OM-D	Advanced							E-M5			E-M5 II ^{R}					E-M5 III ^{R}						
Olympus	SLR style OM-D	Mid-range									E-M10		E-M10 II		E-M10 III			E-M10 IV					
Olympus	Rangefinder style PEN	Mid-range		E-P1	E-P2		E-P3				E-P5		PEN-F ^{R}										
Olympus	Rangefinder style PEN	Upper-entry			E-PL1	E-PL2		E-PL3	E-PL5		E-PL6	E-PL7		E-PL8	E-PL9		E-PL10						
Olympus	Rangefinder style PEN	Entry-level					E-PM1		E-PM2														
Olympus	remote													Air									
OM System	SLR style	Professional																	OM-1 ^{R}		OM-1 II ^{R}		
OM System	SLR style	High-end																				OM-3 ^{R}	
OM System	SLR style	Advanced																		OM-5 ^{R}			OM-5 II ^{R}
OM System	PEN	Mid-range																	E-P7				
Panasonic	SLR style	High-end Video													GH5S				GH6 ^{R}			GH7 ^{R}	
Panasonic	SLR style	High-end Photo													G9 ^{R}						G9 II ^{R}		
Panasonic	SLR style	High-end		GH1		GH2			GH3		GH4				GH5				GH5II				
Panasonic	SLR style	Mid-range		G1	G2		G3		G5		G6		G7	G80/G85			G90/G95						
Panasonic	SLR style	Entry-level			G10													G100			G100D		
Panasonic	Rangefinder style	Advanced							GX1		GX7		GX8		GX9								
Panasonic	Rangefinder style	Mid-range									GM1	GM5	GX80/GX85										
Panasonic	Rangefinder style	Entry-level			GF1	GF2	GF3		GF5		GF6	GF7	GF8	GX800/GX850/GF9		GX880/GF10/GF90							
Panasonic	Camcorder	Professional							AG-AF104														
Kodak	Rangefinder style	Entry-level										S-1											
DJI	Drone	.												Zenmuse X5S									
DJI	Drone	.												Zenmuse X5									
YI	Rangefinder style	Entry-level												M1									
Yongnuo	Rangefinder style	Android camera															YN450M		YN455				
Blackmagic Design	Rangefinder style	High-End Video							Cinema Camera														
Blackmagic Design	Rangefinder style	High-End Video									Pocket Cinema Camera					Pocket Cinema Camera 4K							
Blackmagic Design		High-End Video										Micro Cinema Camera									Micro Studio Camera 4K G2		
Z CAM	Cinema	Advanced											E1			E2							
Z CAM	Cinema	Mid-Range																E2-M4					
Z CAM	Cinema	Entry-Level															E2C						
JVC	Camcorder	Professional										GY-LS300											
SVS-Vistek		Industrial							EVO Tracer														
