= OM System OM-5 =

2022 digital camera model

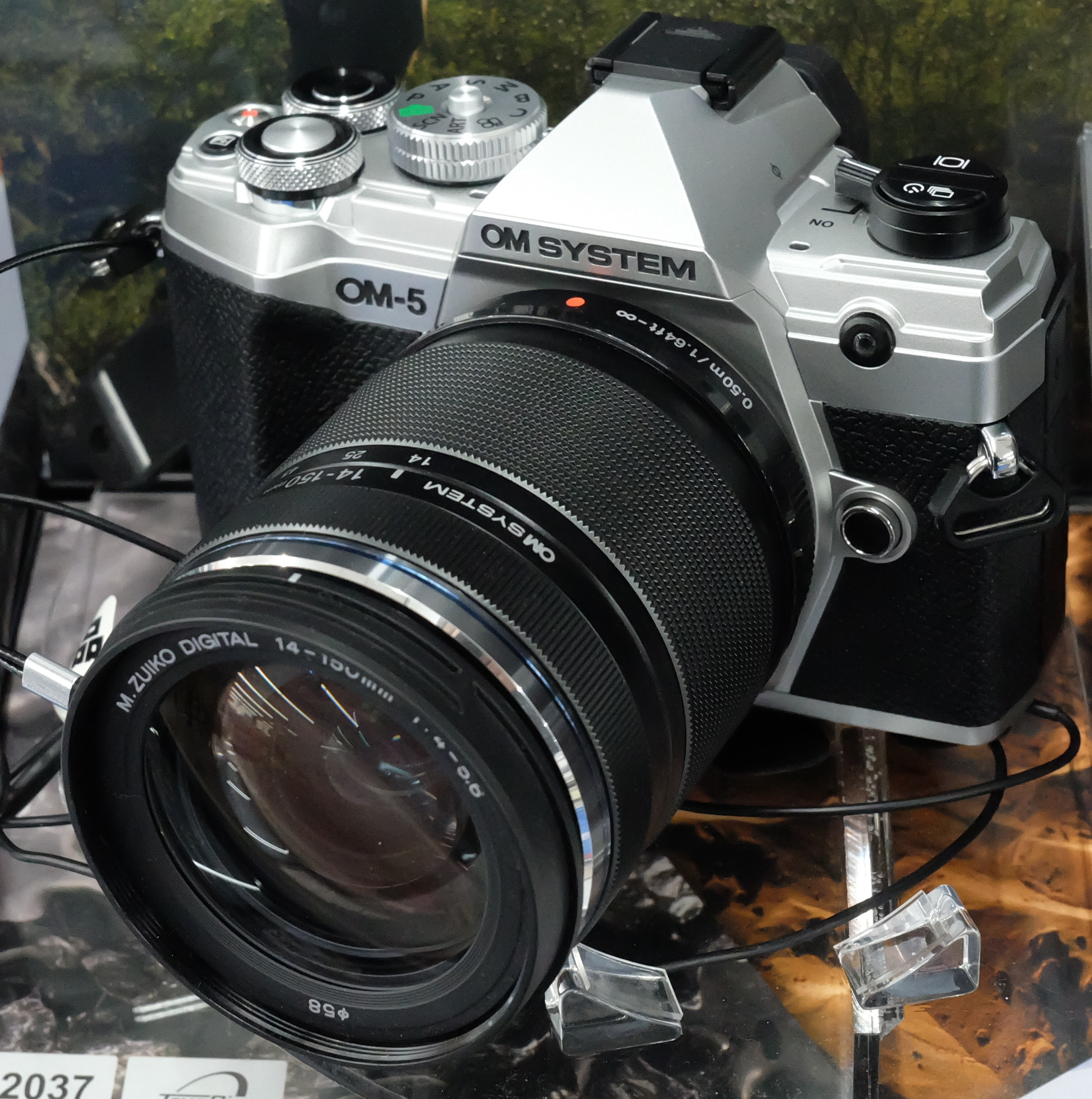
- OM System OM-5 + M.Zuiko digital ED 14-150mm F4.0-5.6 II

Overview
- Maker: OM Digital Solutions
- Type: mirrorless interchangeable-lens camera
- Released: 18 November 2022; 3 years ago
- Intro price: JPY 165,000

Lens
- Lens mount: Micro Four Thirds

Sensor/medium
- Sensor: 5184 x 3888 (20.37 Megapixel)
- Sensor type: Live MOS
- Sensor size: 17.3 x 13mm (Four Thirds type)
- Sensor maker: Sony
- Film speed: 64-6400 (expandable 25600)
- Recording medium: SD, SDHC, SDXC

Focusing
- Focus: High-speed Imager AF
- Focus areas: 121 point

Flash
- Flash: none

Shutter
- Frame rate: HD 60p, FHD 60p, 4K 30p, C4K 24p
- Shutter speeds: 1/8000s-60s
- Continuous shooting: 10fps(mechanical); 10/30fps(electronic)

Viewfinder
- Electronic viewfinder: built-in 2.36 MP
- Viewfinder magnification: 1.23x - 1.37x
- Frame coverage: 100%

Image processing
- Image processor: TruePic IX

General
- LCD screen: 3" 1.04M dots Variangle Touchscreen
- Battery: BLS-50(USB recheargeable)
- AV port(s): USB2.0 Type-B, HDMI Type-D
- Data port(s): IEEE 802.11a/b/g/n, Wi-fi, Bluetooth Low Energy
- Body features: In-Body Image Stabillization, Weather Sealed
- Dimensions: 125.3×85.2×49.7 mm (4.93×3.35×1.96 in)
- Weight: 414 g (14.6 oz) (with battery, memory card)
- Made in: Vietnam

Chronology
- Predecessor: Olympus OM-D E-M5 Mark III
- Successor: OM-5 Mark II

The OM System OM-5 is a mirrorless interchangeable-lens camera with a Micro Four Thirds mount, announced by OM Digital Solutions on 26 October 2022 and released in November. This was the first camera to be branded "OM SYSTEM" for the EVF, replacing the old "OLYMPUS" branding. In keeping with the "camera you can take with you" philosophy, the OM-5's functions such as 5-axis image stabilisation, Computational Photo, Hi-Res Shot, dustproof, water-proof and low temperature resistance were inherited, while a compact and lightweight body was pursued.

== Features ==
- 20 Megapixel Four Thirds sensor
- 121-point hybrid autofocus (AF) system
- Built-in computational photography: high resolution mode (50 MP hand-held and 80 MP tripod-mounted), focus-stacking, HDR, live neutral density (ND) and multiple exposures.
- 10 frame per second burst shooting with continuous autofocus (AF-C) option, 30 fps with electronic shutter
- Cinema (DCI) and UHD 4K video with no time limitation
- Up to 7.5 EV of image stabilization (CIPA-rating) with supported lenses
- 2.36M-dot OLED viewfinder with 60 fps refresh rate
- Direct control buttons and articulating touchscreen
- IP53-rated weather-sealed body
- In-camera USB charging (micro-USB)
- 1/8000 sec mechanical shutter speed
- UVC/UAC USB-standard video for use as webcam
- Pro Capture funcationality

The OM-5 originally retailed for a MSRP of $1,199.99 (body only) or $1,599.99 as a kit with the 12-45mm F4 PRO lens. The enthusiast photography web site Digital Photography Review awarded the OM-5 the 'Silver Award'. Reviews cited the light weight, weather sealing and range of lenses that make it a good all-purpose camera. The in-camera computational photography modes give features that normally require post-processing in external software. A few deficiencies such as lack of animal detection auto-focus, older micro USB port and older sensor were noted.

== OM-5 Mark II ==
OM-5 II sand beige body

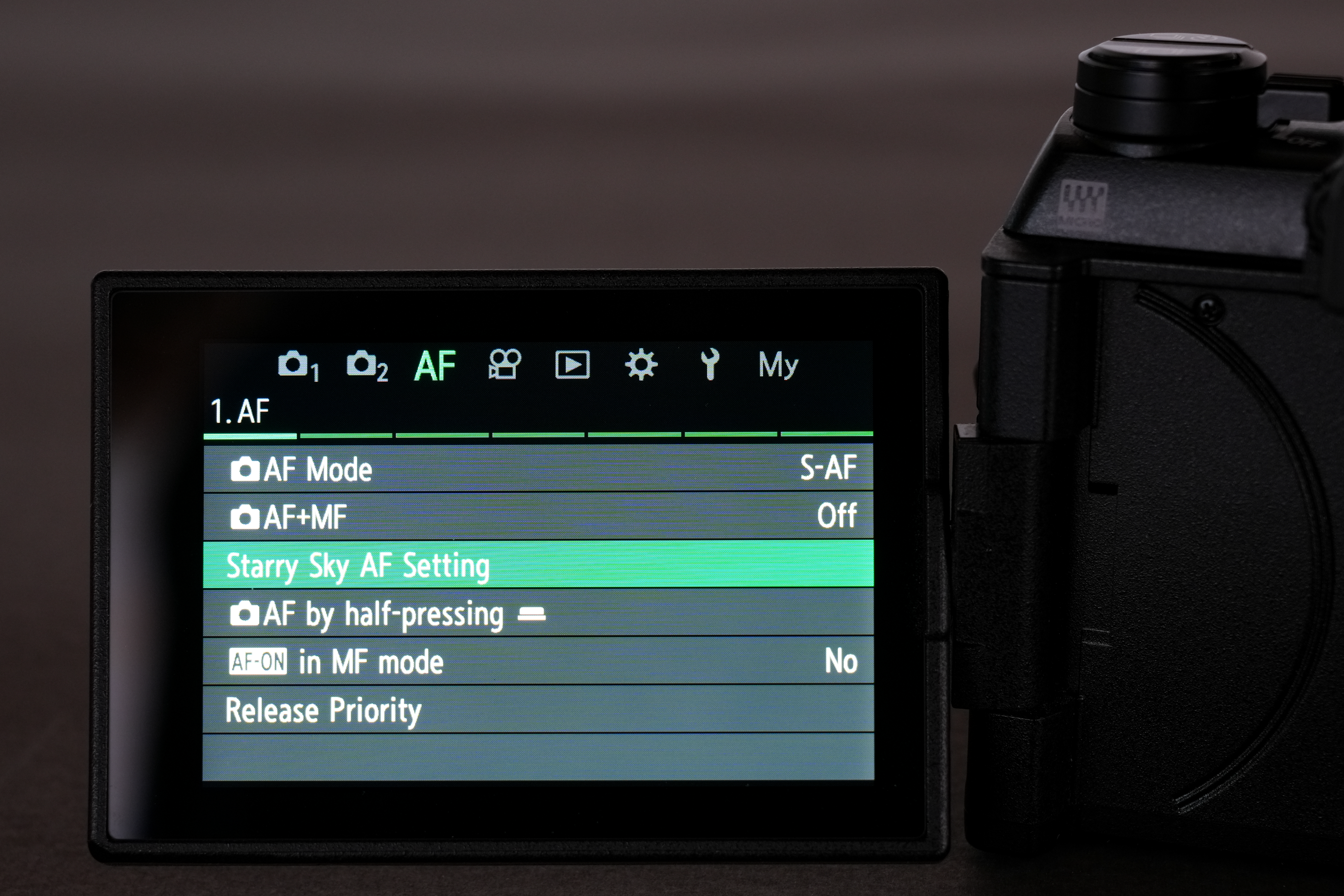
Colour-coded menus on monitor

In June 2025, OM System announced the Mark II version of the OM-5. The MSRP at the release was $1,199.99 (body only). Two kits bundles were available: with the 12-45mm F4 PRO lens for $1,599.99; with the M.Zuiko 14-150mm F4.0-5.6 II lens for $1,499.99. The body is available in black, silver and sand beige variants.

=== Comparison with the OM-5 ===
The OM-5 II uses the same 20MP sensor and processor as its predecessor. The body dimensions and weight are identical. There are a number of changes, mostly in software, to enhance usability. With light body weight of 414 g (14.6 oz) and IP53 weather sealing, the camera is aimed at travel photographers. Image quality is average compared to similar camera.

Changes include:

- Improved, colour-coded menus used in the high-end OM-1 and OM-3, with enhanced navigation. The OK button in the 4-way dial provides quick access to many shooting settings.
- The exposure compensation button has been replaced by a CP (computational photography) button for quick access to built-in computational photography features. These are the same as in the OM-5.
- Improved human eye detection in auto-focus.
- Night-vision mode for low-light shooting and Handheld Assist to indicate camera steadiness.
- Burst shooting at 10 frames/sec with continuous auto-focus; the predecessor locked focus at the start of the burst.
- Two new colour modes for video shooting.
- The USB port uses USB-C rather than the older micro USB.
- The hand grip on the right front is larger for easier handling.

== Gallery ==
=== OM-5 ===
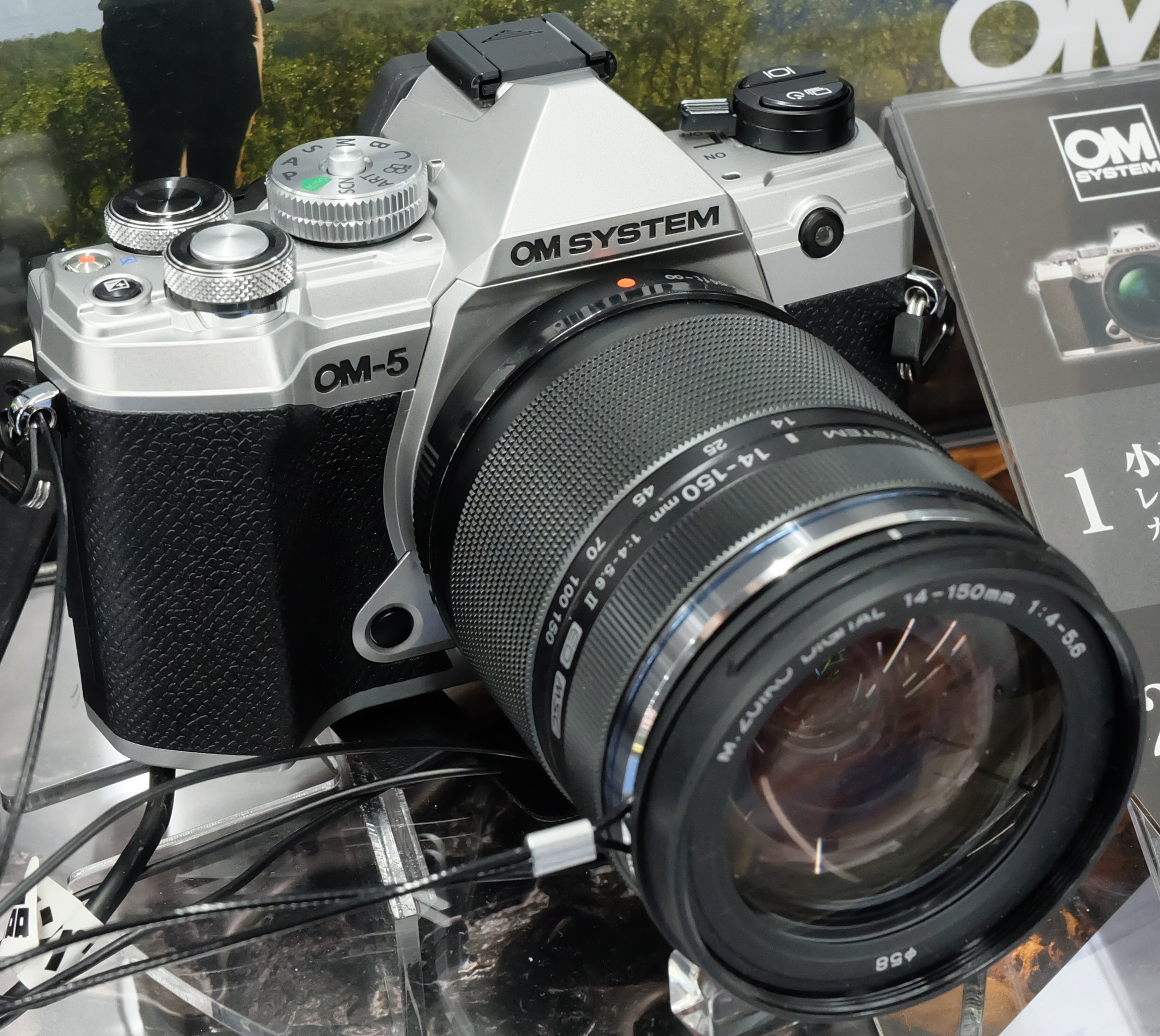
Silver, with 14-150mm lens: front

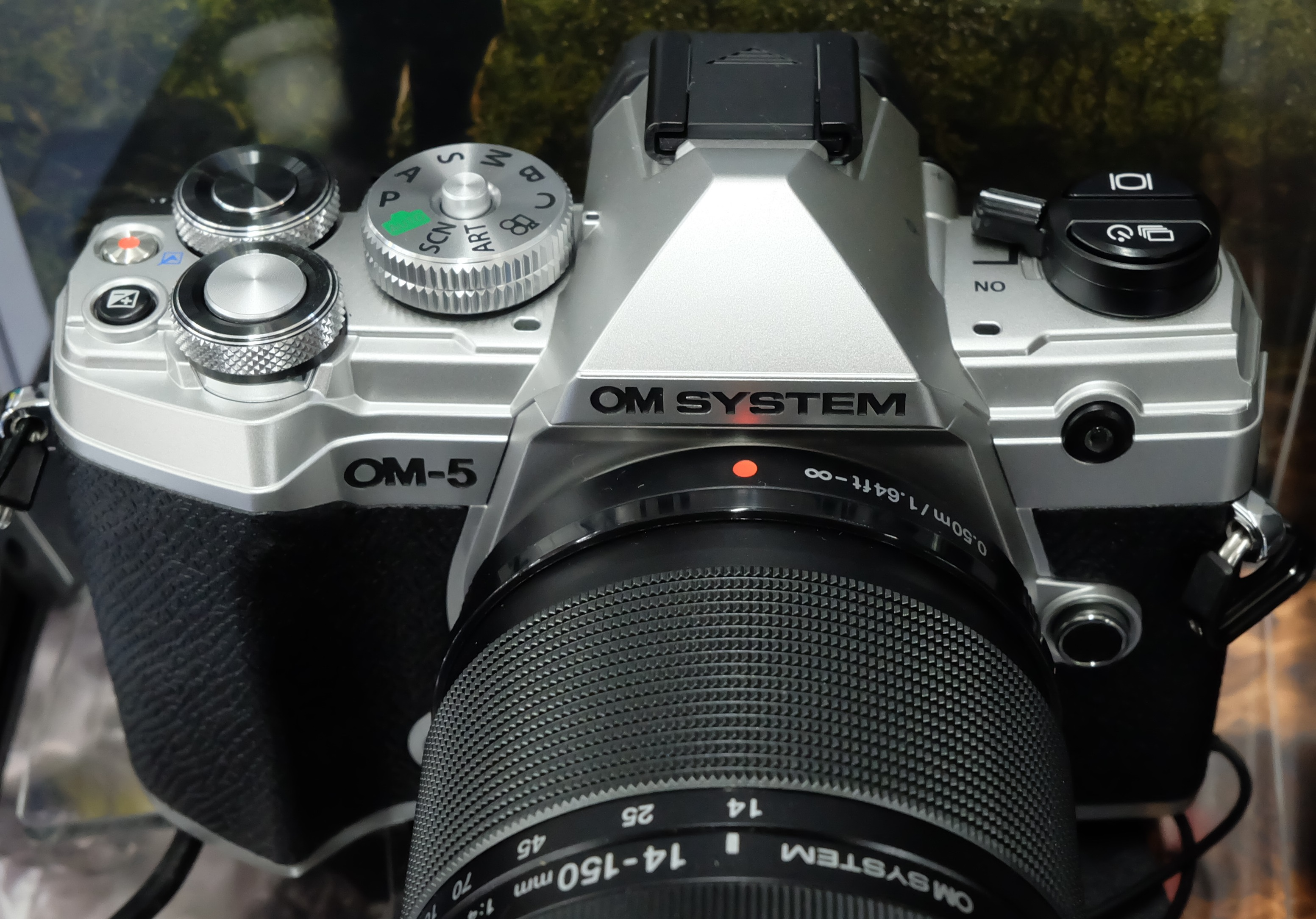
Silver, with 14-150mm lens: top

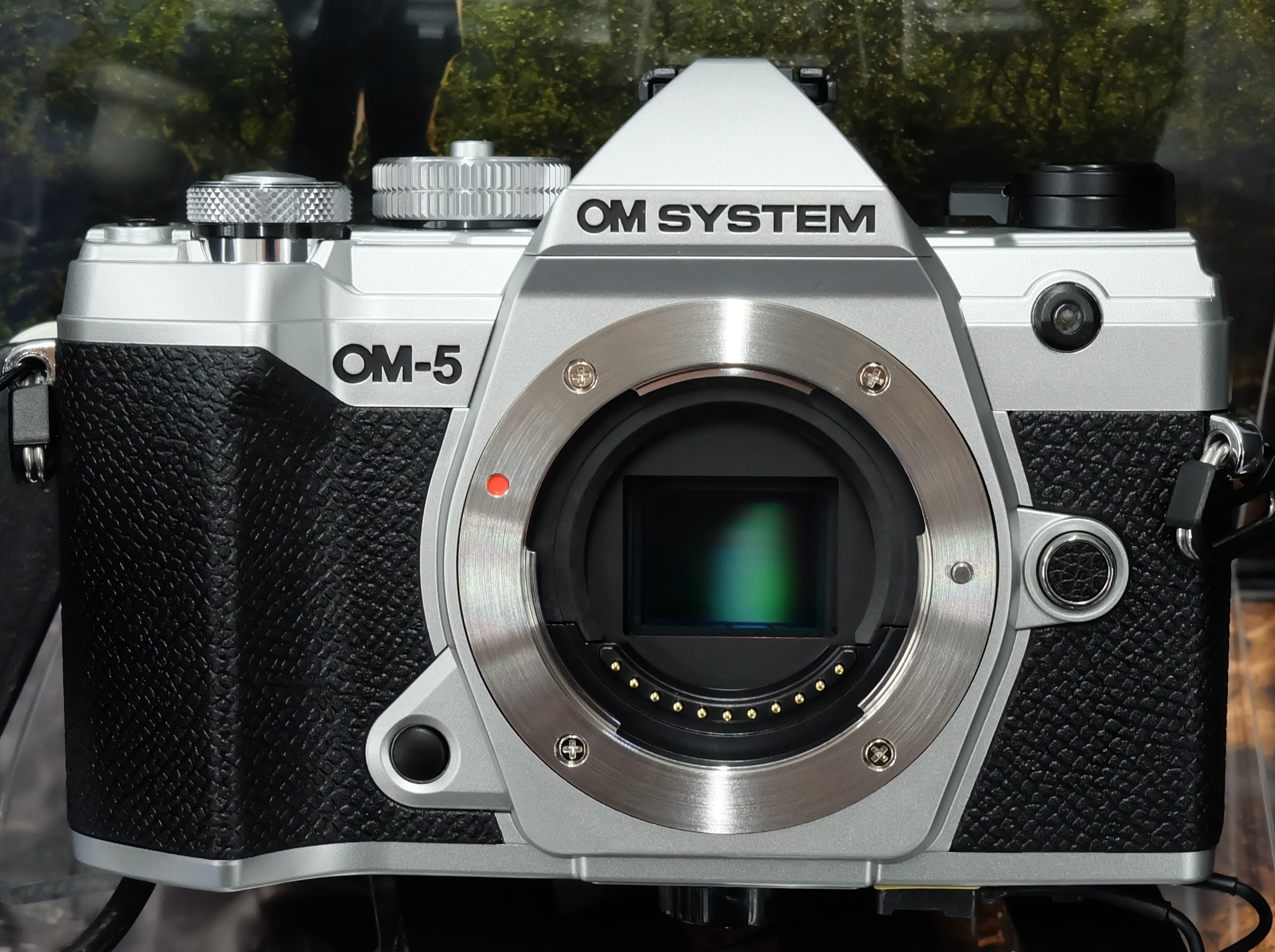
Silver body: front

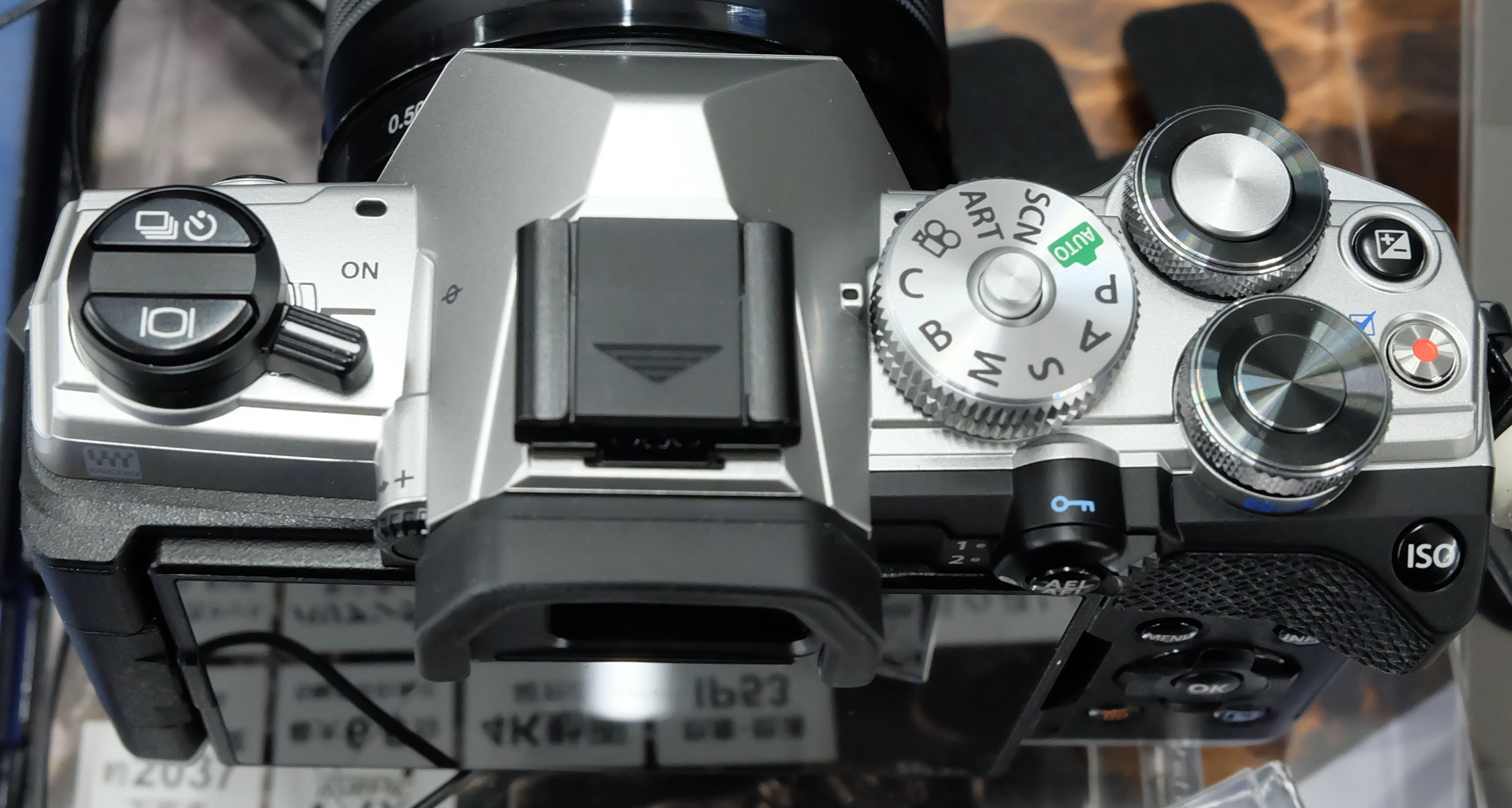
Top rear

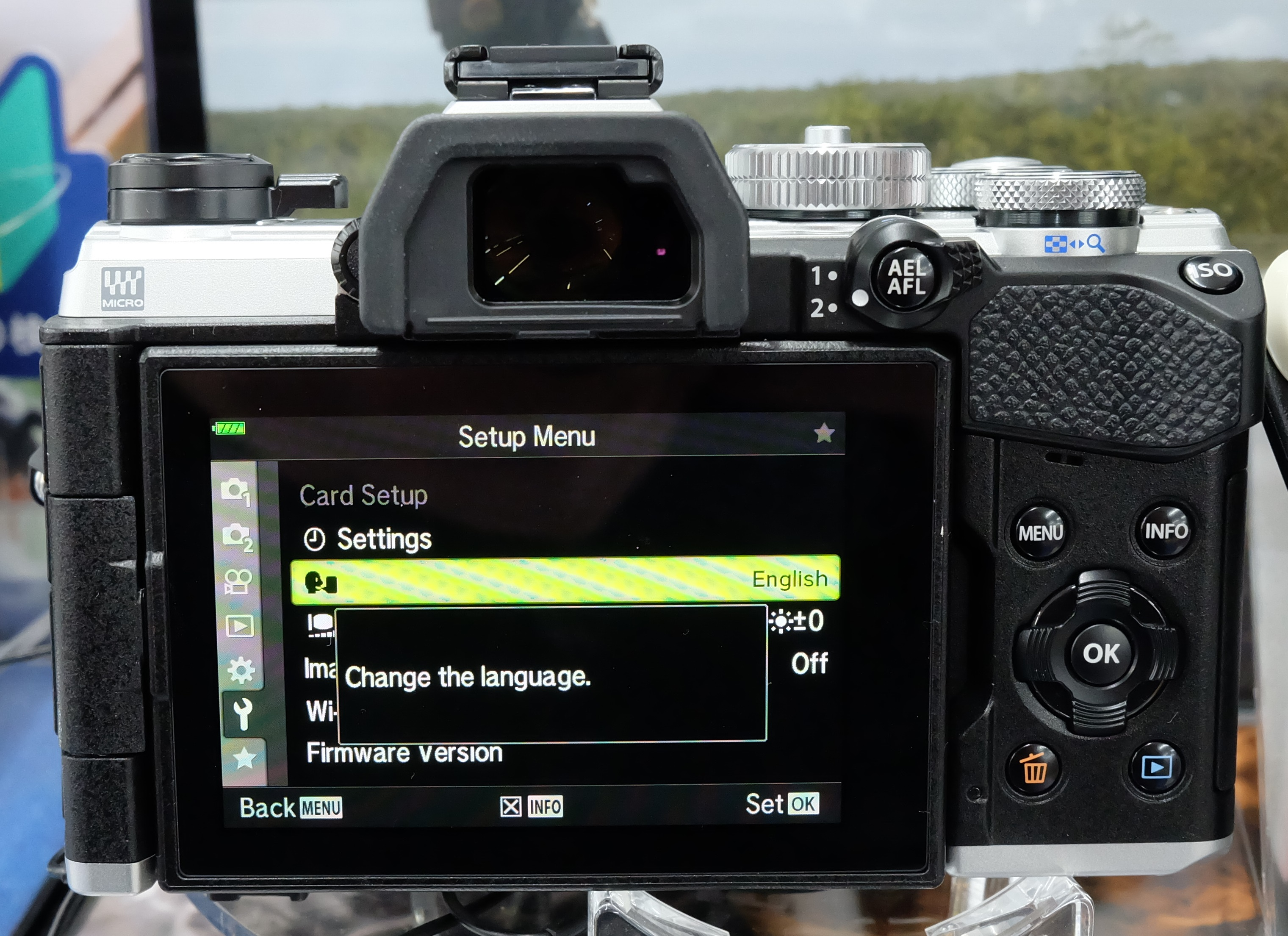
Menu on monitor

=== OM-5 Mark II ===
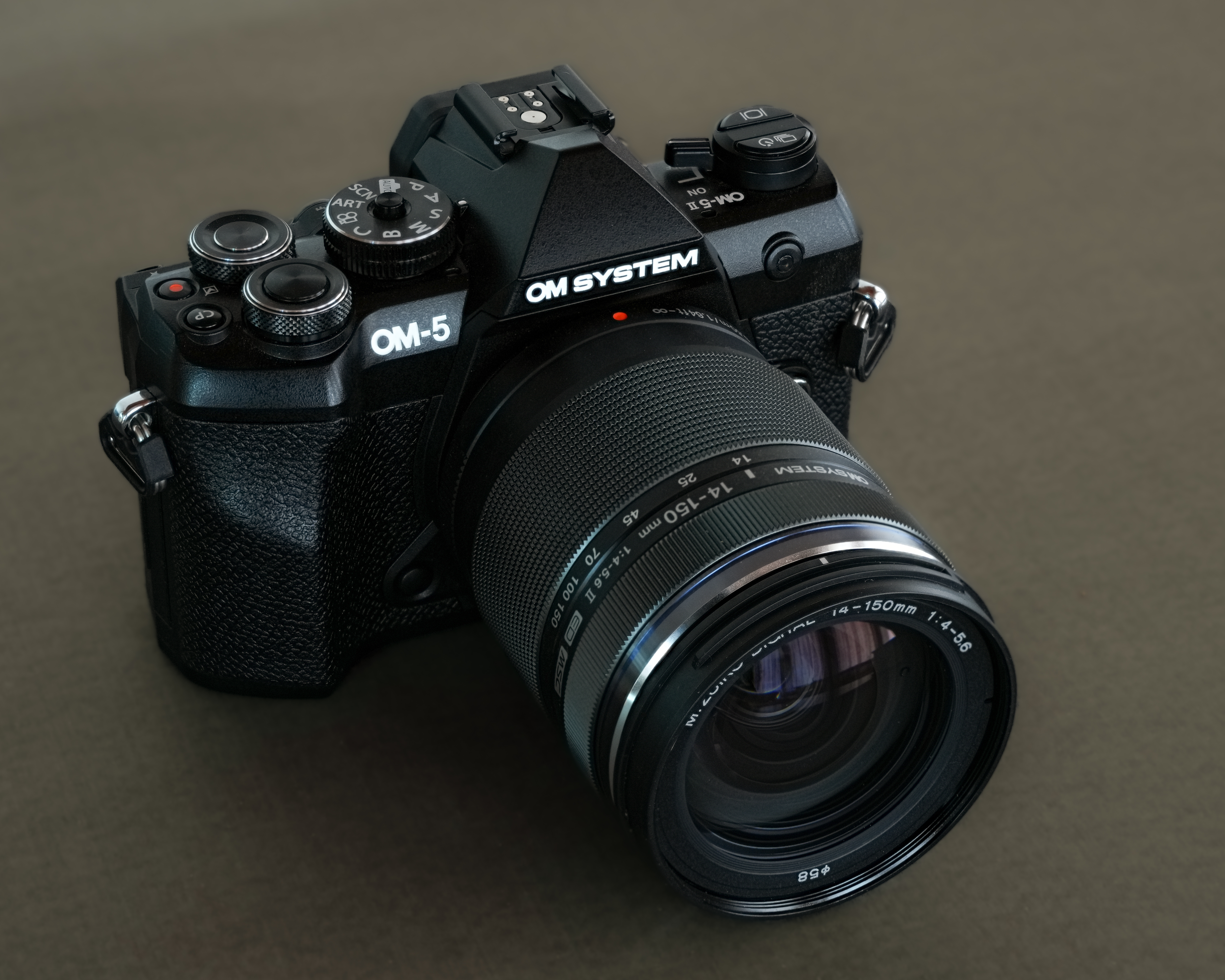
With 14-150mm lens: front

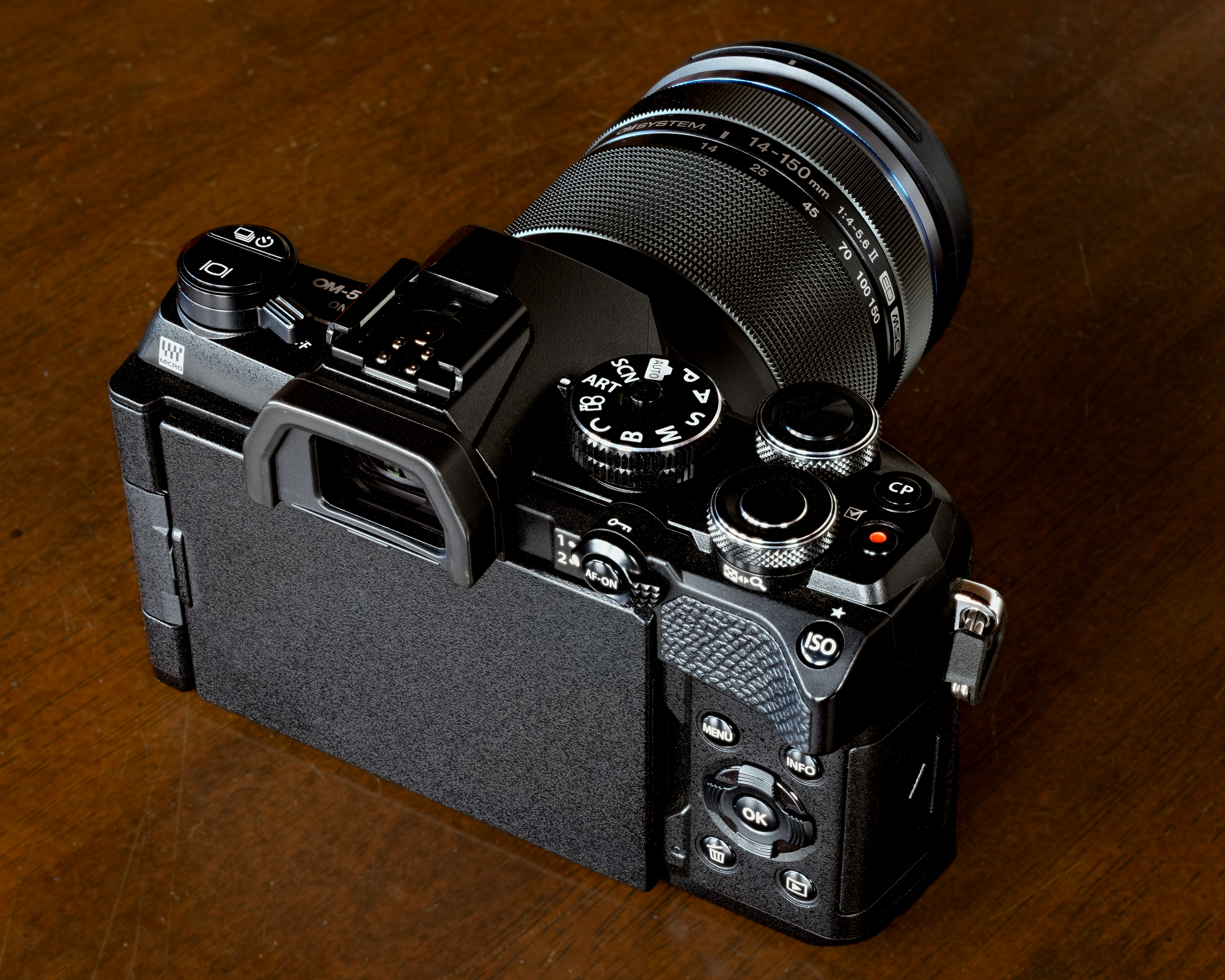
With 14-150mm lens: rear

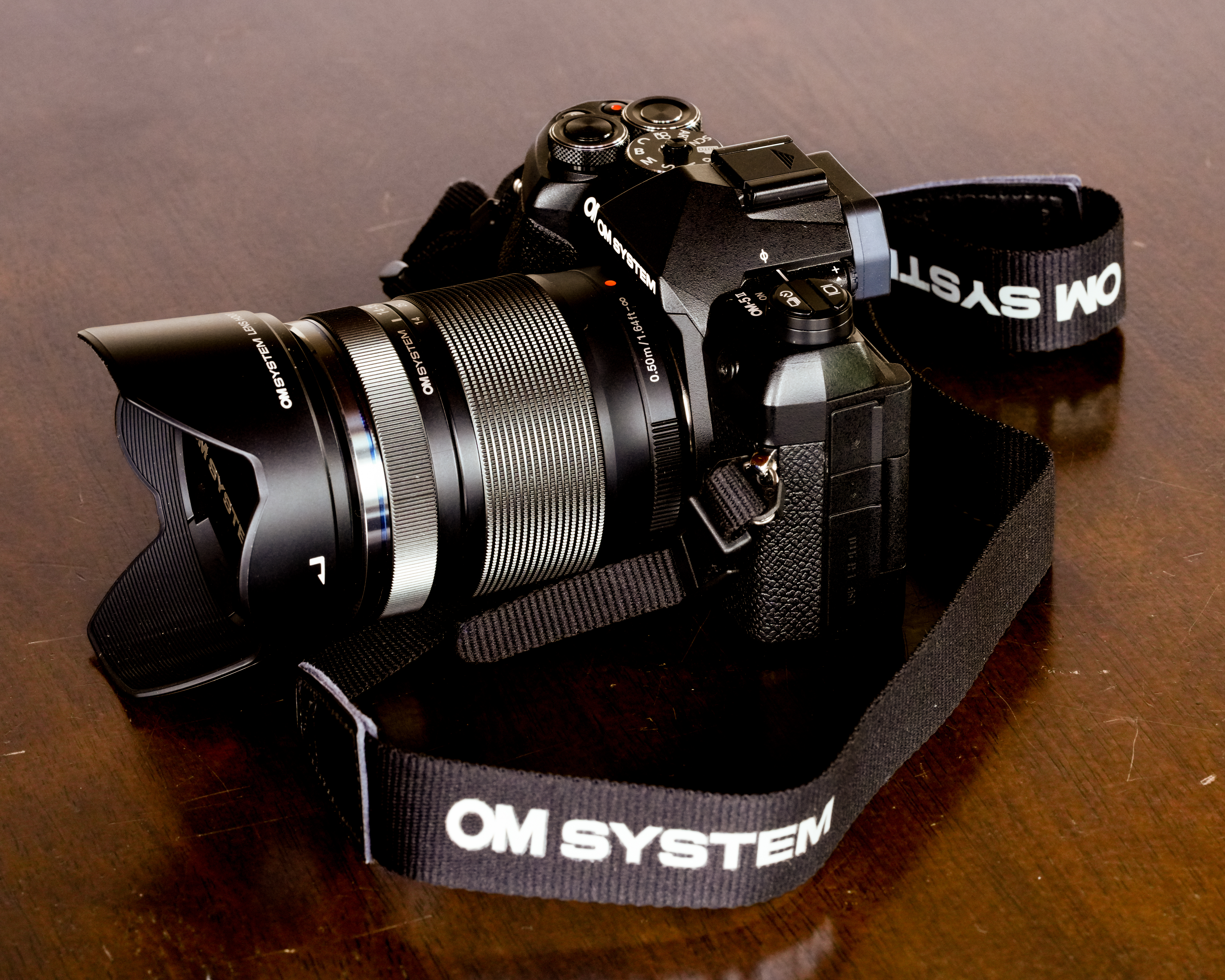
With 14-150mm lens, strap and lens hood

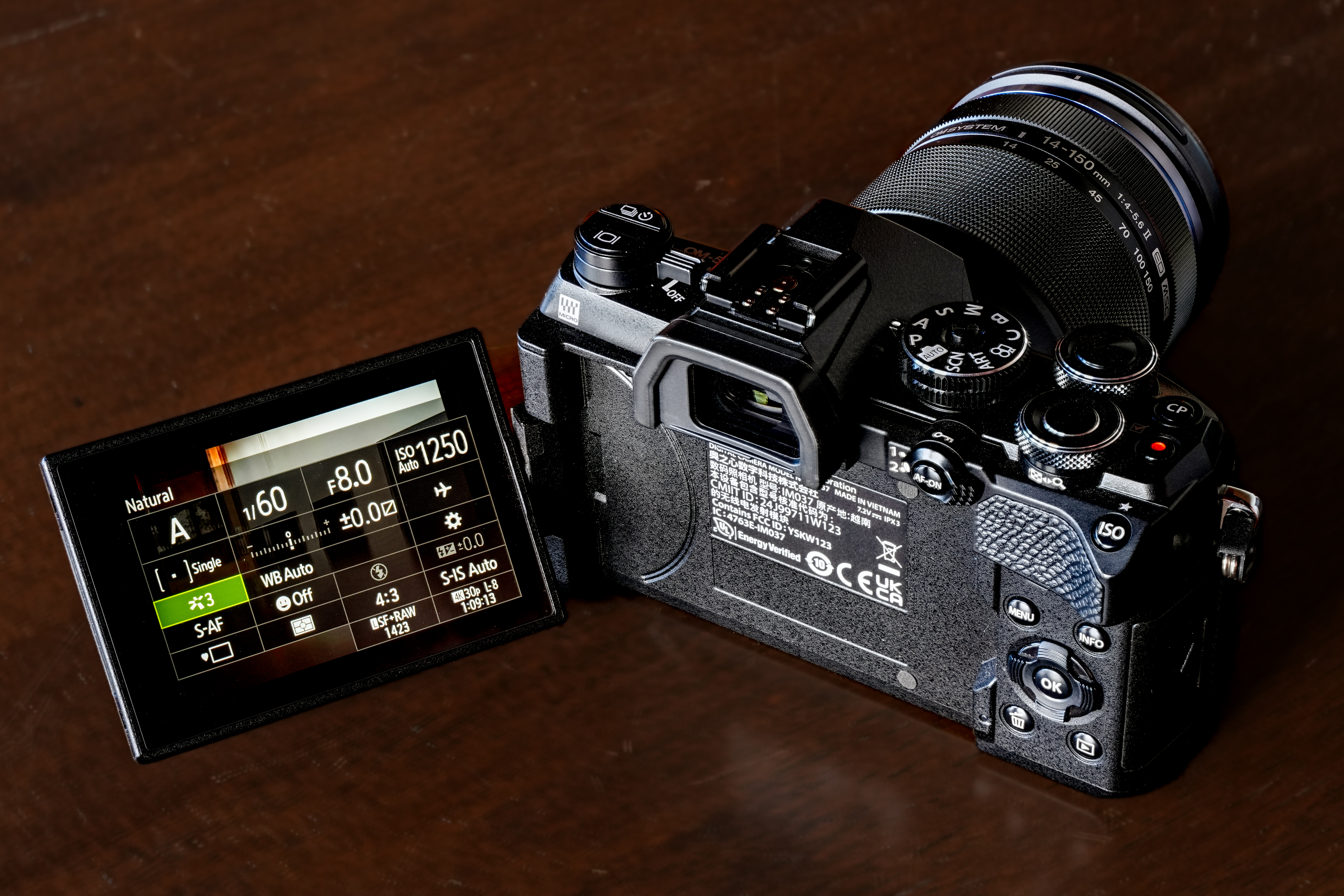
Super control panel on monitor

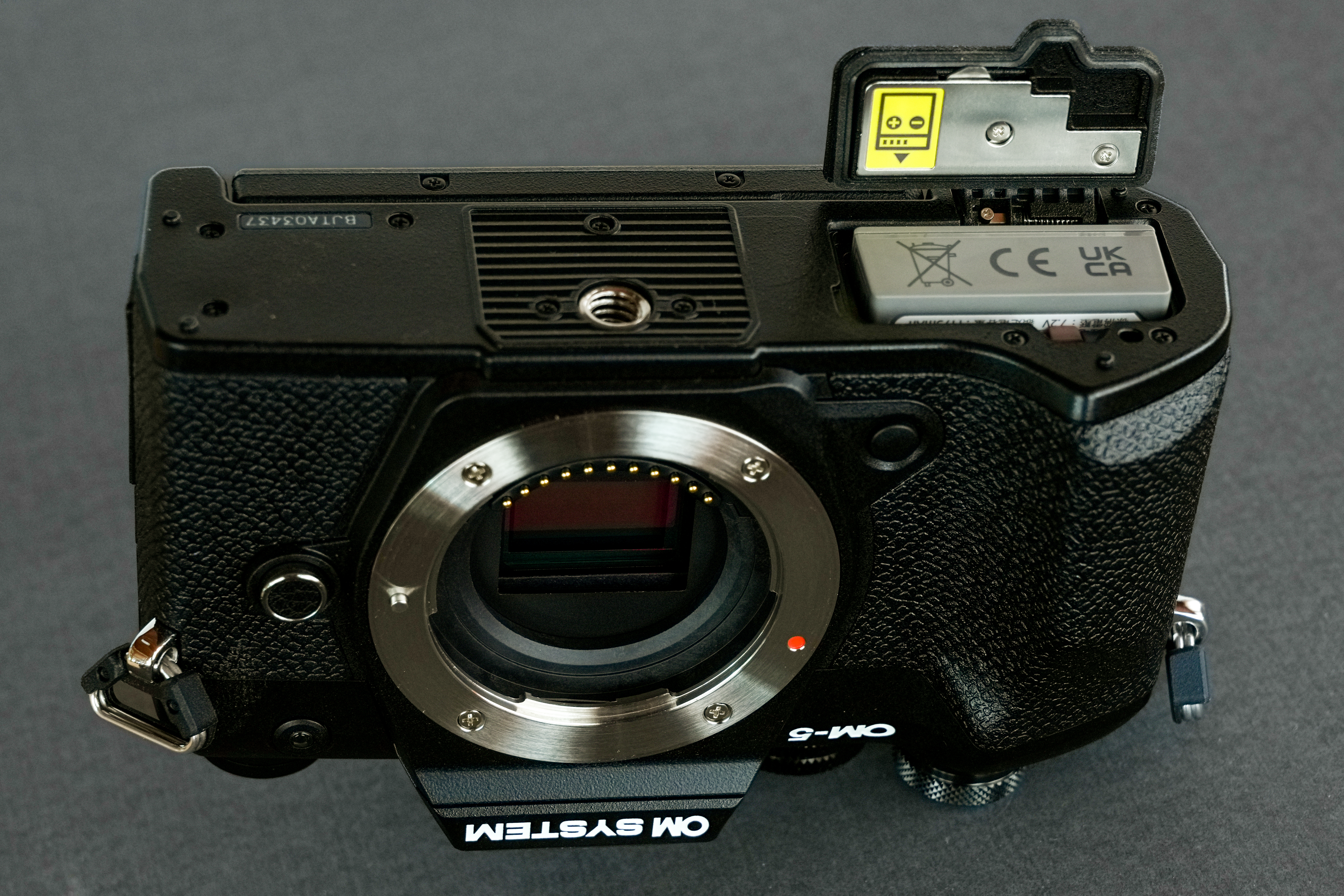
Base plate with open battery cover

== See also ==
- List of retro-style digital cameras

| Brand | Form | Class | 2008 | 2009 | 2010 | 2011 | | | 2012 | 2013 | 2014 | 2015 | 2016 | 2017 | 2018 | 2019 | 2020 | 2021 | 2022 | 2023 | 2024 | 2025 | 2026 |
| Olympus | SLR style OM-D | Professional | | | | | | | | | | | | | | | E-M1X ^{R} | | | | | | |
| Olympus | SLR style OM-D | High-end | | | | | | | | | E-M1 | | | E-M1 II ^{R} | | | E-M1 III ^{R} | | | | | | |
| Olympus | SLR style OM-D | Advanced | | | | | | | E-M5 | | | E-M5 II ^{R} | | | | | E-M5 III ^{R} | | | | | | |
| Olympus | SLR style OM-D | Mid-range | | | | | | | | | E-M10 | | E-M10 II | | E-M10 III | | | E-M10 IV | | | | | |
| Olympus | Rangefinder style PEN | Mid-range | | E-P1 | E-P2 | | E-P3 | | | | E-P5 | | PEN-F ^{R} | | | | | | | | | | |
| Olympus | Rangefinder style PEN | Upper-entry | | | E-PL1 | E-PL2 | | E-PL3 | E-PL5 | | E-PL6 | E-PL7 | | E-PL8 | E-PL9 | | E-PL10 | | | | | | |
| Olympus | Rangefinder style PEN | Entry-level | | | | | E-PM1 | | E-PM2 | | | | | | | | | | | | | | |
| Olympus | remote | | | | | | | | | | | | | Air | | | | | | | | | |
| OM System | SLR style | Professional | | | | | | | | | | | | | | | | | OM-1 ^{R} | | OM-1 II ^{R} | | |
| OM System | SLR style | High-end | | | | | | | | | | | | | | | | | | | | OM-3 ^{R} | |
| OM System | SLR style | Advanced | | | | | | | | | | | | | | | | | | OM-5 ^{R} | | | OM-5 II ^{R} |
| OM System | PEN | Mid-range | | | | | | | | | | | | | | | | | E-P7 | | | | |
| Panasonic | SLR style | High-end Video | | | | | | | | | | | | | GH5S | | | | GH6 ^{R} | | | GH7 ^{R} | |
| Panasonic | SLR style | High-end Photo | | | | | | | | | | | | | G9 ^{R} | | | | | | G9 II ^{R} | | |
| Panasonic | SLR style | High-end | | GH1 | | GH2 | | | GH3 | | GH4 | | | | GH5 | | | | GH5II | | | | |
| Panasonic | SLR style | Mid-range | | G1 | G2 | | G3 | | G5 | | G6 | | G7 | G80/G85 | | | G90/G95 | | | | | | |
| Panasonic | SLR style | Entry-level | | | G10 | | | | | | | | | | | | | G100 | | | G100D | | |
| Panasonic | Rangefinder style | Advanced | | | | | | | GX1 | | GX7 | | GX8 | | GX9 | | | | | | | | |
| Panasonic | Rangefinder style | Mid-range | | | | | | | | | GM1 | GM5 | GX80/GX85 | | | | | | | | | | |
| Panasonic | Rangefinder style | Entry-level | | | GF1 | GF2 | GF3 | | GF5 | | GF6 | GF7 | GF8 | GX800/GX850/GF9 | | GX880/GF10/GF90 | | | | | | | |
| Panasonic | Camcorder | Professional | | | | | | | AG-AF104 | | | | | | | | | | | | | | |
| Kodak | Rangefinder style | Entry-level | | | | | | | | | | S-1 | | | | | | | | | | | |
| DJI | Drone | . | | | | | | | | | | | | Zenmuse X5S | | | | | | | | | |
| DJI | Drone | . | | | | | | | | | | | | Zenmuse X5 | | | | | | | | | |
| YI | Rangefinder style | Entry-level | | | | | | | | | | | | M1 | | | | | | | | | |
| Yongnuo | Rangefinder style | Android camera | | | | | | | | | | | | | | | YN450M | | YN455 | | | | |
| Blackmagic Design | Rangefinder style | High-End Video | | | | | | | Cinema Camera | | | | | | | | | | | | | | |
| Blackmagic Design | Rangefinder style | High-End Video | | | | | | | | | Pocket Cinema Camera | | | | | Pocket Cinema Camera 4K | | | | | | | |
| Blackmagic Design | | High-End Video | | | | | | | | | | Micro Cinema Camera | | | | | | | | | Micro Studio Camera 4K G2 | | |
| Z CAM | Cinema | Advanced | | | | | | | | | | | E1 | | | E2 | | | | | | | |
| Z CAM | Cinema | Mid-Range | | | | | | | | | | | | | | | | E2-M4 | | | | | |
| Z CAM | Cinema | Entry-Level | | | | | | | | | | | | | | | E2C | | | | | | |
| JVC | Camcorder | Professional | | | | | | | | | | GY-LS300 | | | | | | | | | | | |
| SVS-Vistek | | Industrial | | | | | | | EVO Tracer | | | | | | | | | | | | | | |
