= Japan Industrial Partners =

Japanese private equity firm

Japan Industrial Partners, Inc.
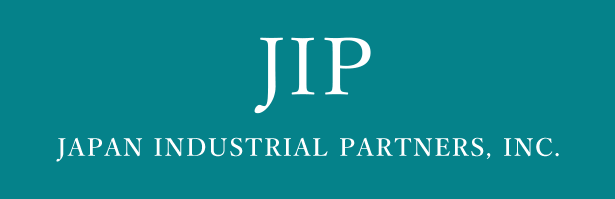
- Company type: Private
- Industry: Private equity
- Founded: 2002; 24 years ago
- Headquarters: Tokyo, Japan
- Key people: Hidemi Moue (CEO)
- Subsidiaries: ITX Corp; Kyowa Hakko Chemical; Nippon Avionics; SunTelephone; Toshiba; OJ Holdings, Ltd
- Website: jipinc.com

Japan Industrial Partners, Inc. is a Japanese private equity firm based in Tokyo. Founded in 2002, it received investment from firms including Mizuho Financial Group and Bain & Company. Its CEO is Hidemi Moue.

== History ==
In 2007, Japan Industrial Partners bought SunTelephone with Bain Capital. In 2010, it purchased Kyowa Hakko Chemical from Kyowa Hakko Kirin.

In 2012, Japan Industrial Partners bought the core operations of the telecommunications company ITX Corp from Olympus Corporation for $676 million.

In 2014, Japan Industrial Partners bought the computer manufacturer Vaio from Sony. In 2020, Japan Industrial Partners bought Nippon Avionics from NEC, and changed the company's leadership.

In 2020, the company bought the imaging arm of Olympus. This was transferred to a new company, named OM Digital Solutions, in 2022, as the deal only allowed the brand name to be used for a transitional period.

In 2023, Japan Industrial Partners and 19 other companies, including Orix, Rohm and Chubu Electric Power, offered to buy Toshiba for US$15 billion, which was accepted by Toshiba's board in September. As a result, Toshiba was delisted from the Tokyo exchange after 74 years.

In 2025, Japan Industrial Partners sold Vaio Corporation to Nojima.

== Operations ==
Japan Industrial Partners operates within the electronics industry, where they perform corporate carve-outs, buyouts, and spinouts.

Japan Industrial Partners maintains a low profile and rarely attends interviews. The firm does not hire restructuring consultants and prefers to manage the restructuring efforts internally.

== List of subsidiaries ==
- Toshiba
- OM Digital Solutions
- Nippon Avionics
- Kyowa Hakko Chemical
- ITX Corp
- SunTelephone
