= OM System OM-1 =

Mirrorless interchangeable-lens camera

- OM System OM-1 with M.ZUIKO DIGITAL ED 12-40mm F2.8 PRO II

Overview
- Maker: OM Digital Solutions
- Type: Mirrorless camera
- Released: March 18, 2022; 4 years ago
- Intro price: ¥273,000/US$2,199 body only

Lens
- Lens mount: Micro Four Thirds
- Compatible lenses: Micro Four Thirds lenses from all manufacturers, including OM System (Olympus), Panasonic, and others

Sensor/medium
- Sensor: Exmor RS IMX472
- Sensor type: Stacked BSI CMOS (branded Live MOS)
- Sensor size: 17.3×13mm (Four Thirds type)
- Sensor maker: Sony
- Maximum resolution: 5184×3888 (20.4 megapixels)
- Recording medium: Dual SDXC UHS-II memory card slots

Focusing
- Focus: Quad Pixel on-sensor phase-detection AF
- Focus areas: 1053 points

Flash
- Flash: No built-in flash
- Compatible flashes: Olympus, Panasonic, and other Micro Four Thirds flash units

Shutter
- Frame rate: Up to 120 fps
- Shutter speed range: 1/8000s−60s
- Continuous shooting: 10 fps with mechanical shutter 50 or 120 fps with blackout-free electronic shutter

Viewfinder
- Electronic viewfinder: Built-in OLED, 5.76M dots
- Viewfinder magnification: 0.83x
- Frame coverage: 100%

Image processing
- Image processor: TruePic X

General
- Video recording: Up to 4K UHD at 60 fps
- LCD screen: 1.62M dots vari-angle touchscreen
- Battery: BLX-1, with in-body USB charging
- Optional battery packs: HLD-10 battery grip
- AV port(s): HDMI Type-D; 3.5mm stereo microphone and headphone jacks
- Data port(s): USB 3.0 Type-C; Wi-Fi 5 and Bluetooth Low Energy
- Body features: In-body image stabilization, IP53 weather sealing
- Dimensions: 134.8 mm × 91.6 mm × 72.7 mm (5.31 in × 3.61 in × 2.86 in) (WHD)
- Weight: 599 g (21.1 oz) with battery and one memory card
- Made in: Vietnam

Chronology
- Predecessor: Olympus OM-D E-M1 Mark III; Olympus OM-D E-M1X
- Successor: OM System OM-1 Mark II

The OM System OM-1 is the flagship mirrorless interchangeable-lens camera produced by OM Digital Solutions on the micro four-thirds system. It is the first high-end digital camera made by OM Digital Solutions after its acquisition of the imaging divisions of the camera manufacturer Olympus.

The OM-1 was announced on February 15, 2022, and began shipping to customers the following month. Despite no longer being a product of Olympus, the OM-1 still bears the Olympus wordmark on the front of its electronic viewfinder, tying the camera to Olympus' flagship E-M1 cameras. The camera's name is the same as the Olympus OM-1 film SLR camera, and was released to coincide with that camera's 50th anniversary. The OM-1 has the Pro Capture functionality.

The OM System OM-1 Mark II is an incremental upgrade released in late February 2024. Compared to the original model it has double the buffer memory, improvements to autofocus and image stabilization and neutral density filter functionality.

== Gallery ==

| Brand | Form | Class | 2008 | 2009 | 2010 | 2011 | | | 2012 | 2013 | 2014 | 2015 | 2016 | 2017 | 2018 | 2019 | 2020 | 2021 | 2022 | 2023 | 2024 | 2025 | 2026 |
| Olympus | SLR style OM-D | Professional | | | | | | | | | | | | | | | E-M1X ^{R} | | | | | | |
| Olympus | SLR style OM-D | High-end | | | | | | | | | E-M1 | | | E-M1 II ^{R} | | | E-M1 III ^{R} | | | | | | |
| Olympus | SLR style OM-D | Advanced | | | | | | | E-M5 | | | E-M5 II ^{R} | | | | | E-M5 III ^{R} | | | | | | |
| Olympus | SLR style OM-D | Mid-range | | | | | | | | | E-M10 | | E-M10 II | | E-M10 III | | | E-M10 IV | | | | | |
| Olympus | Rangefinder style PEN | Mid-range | | E-P1 | E-P2 | | E-P3 | | | | E-P5 | | PEN-F ^{R} | | | | | | | | | | |
| Olympus | Rangefinder style PEN | Upper-entry | | | E-PL1 | E-PL2 | | E-PL3 | E-PL5 | | E-PL6 | E-PL7 | | E-PL8 | E-PL9 | | E-PL10 | | | | | | |
| Olympus | Rangefinder style PEN | Entry-level | | | | | E-PM1 | | E-PM2 | | | | | | | | | | | | | | |
| Olympus | remote | | | | | | | | | | | | | Air | | | | | | | | | |
| OM System | SLR style | Professional | | | | | | | | | | | | | | | | | OM-1 ^{R} | | OM-1 II ^{R} | | |
| OM System | SLR style | High-end | | | | | | | | | | | | | | | | | | | | OM-3 ^{R} | |
| OM System | SLR style | Advanced | | | | | | | | | | | | | | | | | | OM-5 ^{R} | | | OM-5 II ^{R} |
| OM System | PEN | Mid-range | | | | | | | | | | | | | | | | | E-P7 | | | | |
| Panasonic | SLR style | High-end Video | | | | | | | | | | | | | GH5S | | | | GH6 ^{R} | | | GH7 ^{R} | |
| Panasonic | SLR style | High-end Photo | | | | | | | | | | | | | G9 ^{R} | | | | | | G9 II ^{R} | | |
| Panasonic | SLR style | High-end | | GH1 | | GH2 | | | GH3 | | GH4 | | | | GH5 | | | | GH5II | | | | |
| Panasonic | SLR style | Mid-range | | G1 | G2 | | G3 | | G5 | | G6 | | G7 | G80/G85 | | | G90/G95 | | | | | | |
| Panasonic | SLR style | Entry-level | | | G10 | | | | | | | | | | | | | G100 | | | G100D | | |
| Panasonic | Rangefinder style | Advanced | | | | | | | GX1 | | GX7 | | GX8 | | GX9 | | | | | | | | |
| Panasonic | Rangefinder style | Mid-range | | | | | | | | | GM1 | GM5 | GX80/GX85 | | | | | | | | | | |
| Panasonic | Rangefinder style | Entry-level | | | GF1 | GF2 | GF3 | | GF5 | | GF6 | GF7 | GF8 | GX800/GX850/GF9 | | GX880/GF10/GF90 | | | | | | | |
| Panasonic | Camcorder | Professional | | | | | | | AG-AF104 | | | | | | | | | | | | | | |
| Kodak | Rangefinder style | Entry-level | | | | | | | | | | S-1 | | | | | | | | | | | |
| DJI | Drone | . | | | | | | | | | | | | Zenmuse X5S | | | | | | | | | |
| DJI | Drone | . | | | | | | | | | | | | Zenmuse X5 | | | | | | | | | |
| YI | Rangefinder style | Entry-level | | | | | | | | | | | | M1 | | | | | | | | | |
| Yongnuo | Rangefinder style | Android camera | | | | | | | | | | | | | | | YN450M | | YN455 | | | | |
| Blackmagic Design | Rangefinder style | High-End Video | | | | | | | Cinema Camera | | | | | | | | | | | | | | |
| Blackmagic Design | Rangefinder style | High-End Video | | | | | | | | | Pocket Cinema Camera | | | | | Pocket Cinema Camera 4K | | | | | | | |
| Blackmagic Design | | High-End Video | | | | | | | | | | Micro Cinema Camera | | | | | | | | | Micro Studio Camera 4K G2 | | |
| Z CAM | Cinema | Advanced | | | | | | | | | | | E1 | | | E2 | | | | | | | |
| Z CAM | Cinema | Mid-Range | | | | | | | | | | | | | | | | E2-M4 | | | | | |
| Z CAM | Cinema | Entry-Level | | | | | | | | | | | | | | | E2C | | | | | | |
| JVC | Camcorder | Professional | | | | | | | | | | GY-LS300 | | | | | | | | | | | |
| SVS-Vistek | | Industrial | | | | | | | EVO Tracer | | | | | | | | | | | | | | |
