= Olympus OM-D E-M1 =

Digital mirrorless camera

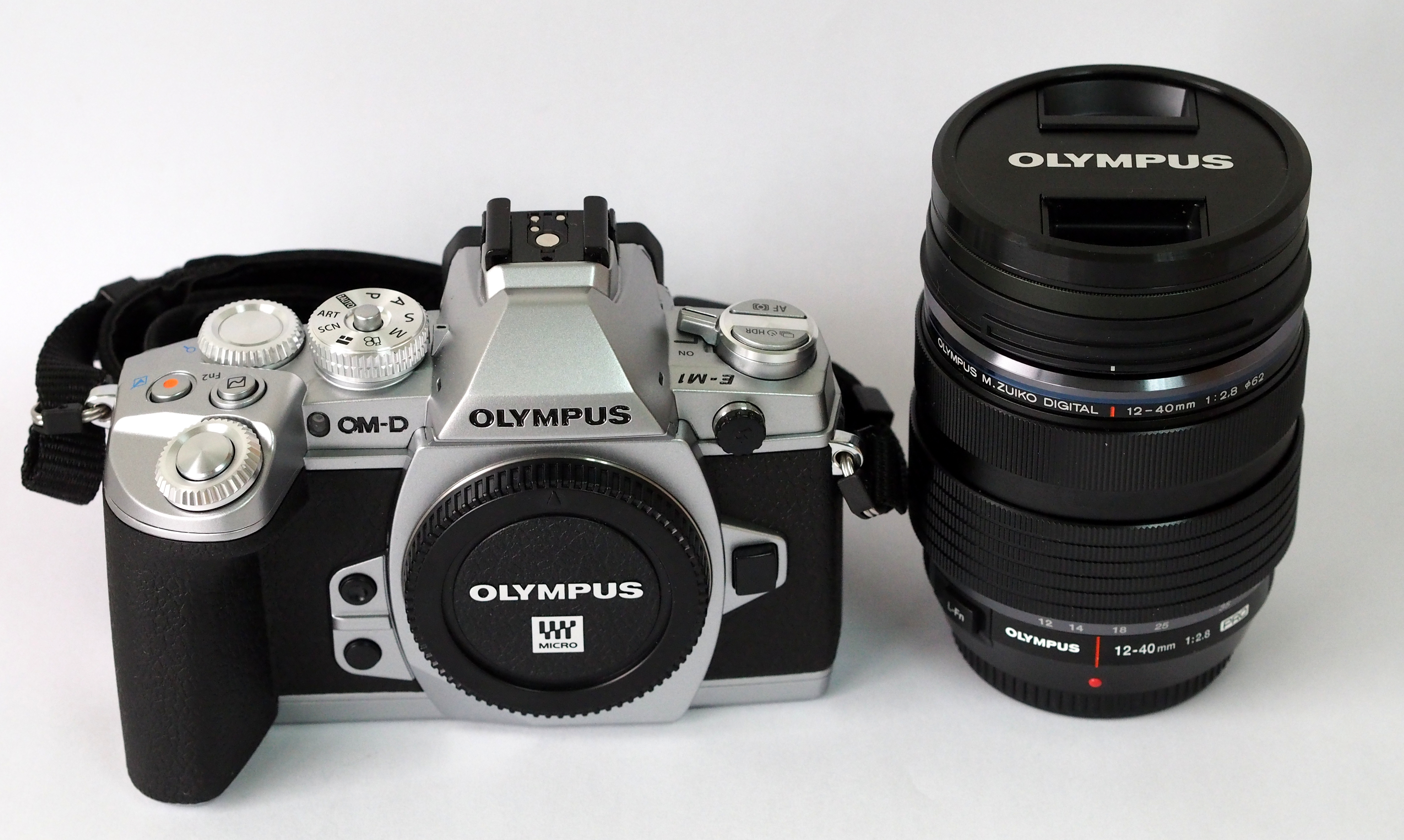
- OM-D E-M1 with M.Zuiko 12-40

Overview
- Maker: Olympus Corporation
- Type: mirrorless interchangeable-lens camera
- Released: September 2013

Lens
- Lens mount: Micro Four Thirds
- Lens: Interchangeable
- Compatible lenses: Panasonic, Leica, Samyang, Tamron, Voigtländer, Yongnuo

Sensor/medium
- Sensor type: Live MOS
- Sensor size: 17.3 x 13 mm (Four Thirds type)
- Sensor maker: Panasonic
- Maximum resolution: 16.0 MP
- Film speed: 200–25600, with "LOW ISO 100"
- Recording medium: Single SD / SDHC / SDXC slot

Focusing
- Focus modes: Contrast Detect (sensor), Phase Detect, Multi-area, Center, Selective single-point, Tracking, Single, Continuous, Touch, Face Detection, Live View
- Focus areas: 81 focus points
- Focus bracketing: No

Exposure/metering
- Exposure bracketing: ±5 (at 1/3 EV, 1/2 EV, 1 EV steps)
- Exposure metering: Yes
- Metering modes: Multi, Center-weighted, Spot

Flash
- Flash: Yes (via hot shoe)
- Flash exposure compensation: Redeye, Fill-in, Flash Off, Red-eye Slow sync. (1st curtain), Slow sync. (1st curtain), Slow sync. (2nd curtain), Manual
- Flash synchronization: 1/320 s
- Flash bracketing: Yes
- Compatible flashes: FL-300R; FL-600R; FL-700WR; FL-900R; FL-LM1; FL-LM2

Shutter
- Shutter: Electronic and mechanical
- Shutter speeds: 1/16000s to 60s
- Continuous shooting: 10 fps (in silent mode)

Viewfinder
- Viewfinder: Yes
- Electronic viewfinder: built-in 2.36 MP (with Auto Luminance, 100% coverage)
- Frame coverage: 100%

Image processing
- Image processor: TruePic VII
- White balance: 7 presets, with custom modes
- WB bracketing: Yes
- Dynamic range bracketing: Yes

General
- Video recording: FHD: 1920×1080, 30/25/24p, MOV, H.264, Linear PCM; HD: 1280×720, Motion JPEG; SD: 640x480, Motion JPEG
- LCD screen: tilting 3 inch, 1,040,000 dots (upwards: 80˚, downwards: 50˚)
- Battery: BLN-1 lithium-ion (CIPA 350)
- Optional battery packs: HLD-7 battery grip
- Optional accessories: RM-UC1 remote cable
- AV ports: Micro HDMI; "Multi-connector" (AV / USB 2.0); 3.5mm audio jack (Microphone, Stereo)
- Data ports: "Multi-connector" (AV / USB 2.0); WiFi 802.11b/g/n; 2.5mm stereo jack for remote
- Body features: Magnesium alloy
- Dimensions: 130×94×63 mm (5.1×3.7×2.5 in)
- Weight: 497 g (18 oz) (1.1 lb) including battery and SD card
- Made in: Vietnam

Chronology
- Successor: Olympus OM-D E-M1 Mark II

The Olympus OM-D E-M1 Micro Four Thirds is a compact mirrorless interchangeable-lens camera introduced on September 10, 2013. It has built-in on sensor phase detection.

As of October 2014, it had the highest camera sensor rating of any Olympus camera, according to DxO Labs, with a score of 73.

== Features include ==
- Sensor: 16 MP Live MOS sensor and no anti-aliasing filter
- Buffer for 40 raw images at 10 frames per second with focus locked or 45 raw images at 6 frame per second with continuous autofocus.
- Image stabilization: Olympus 5-axis image stabilization
- TruePic VII processor with lens correction
- ISO range: 200–25600, with "LOW ISO 100"
- Manual focus with focus peaking
- Focus points
  - 81 in contrast detection autofocus mode
  - 37 in phase detection autofocus mode
- In-camera HDR
- Flash: no built-in flash, small external flash included
- Flash sync: 1/320 s with bundled FL-LM2 flash, otherwise 1/250 s.
- HD video capture, including 1080i at 30 fps and 720p at 60 fps
- Built-in Wi-Fi: 802.11 b/g/n for remote shooting via smartphone or tablet
- Weather sealing: dust, splash, freeze resistance (-10˚C)
- Customizable buttons: 2 on the front
- Built-in microphone socket
- Ports: AP2 accessory port, AV/USB, HDMI connector

== Olympus OM-D E-M1 Mark II ==
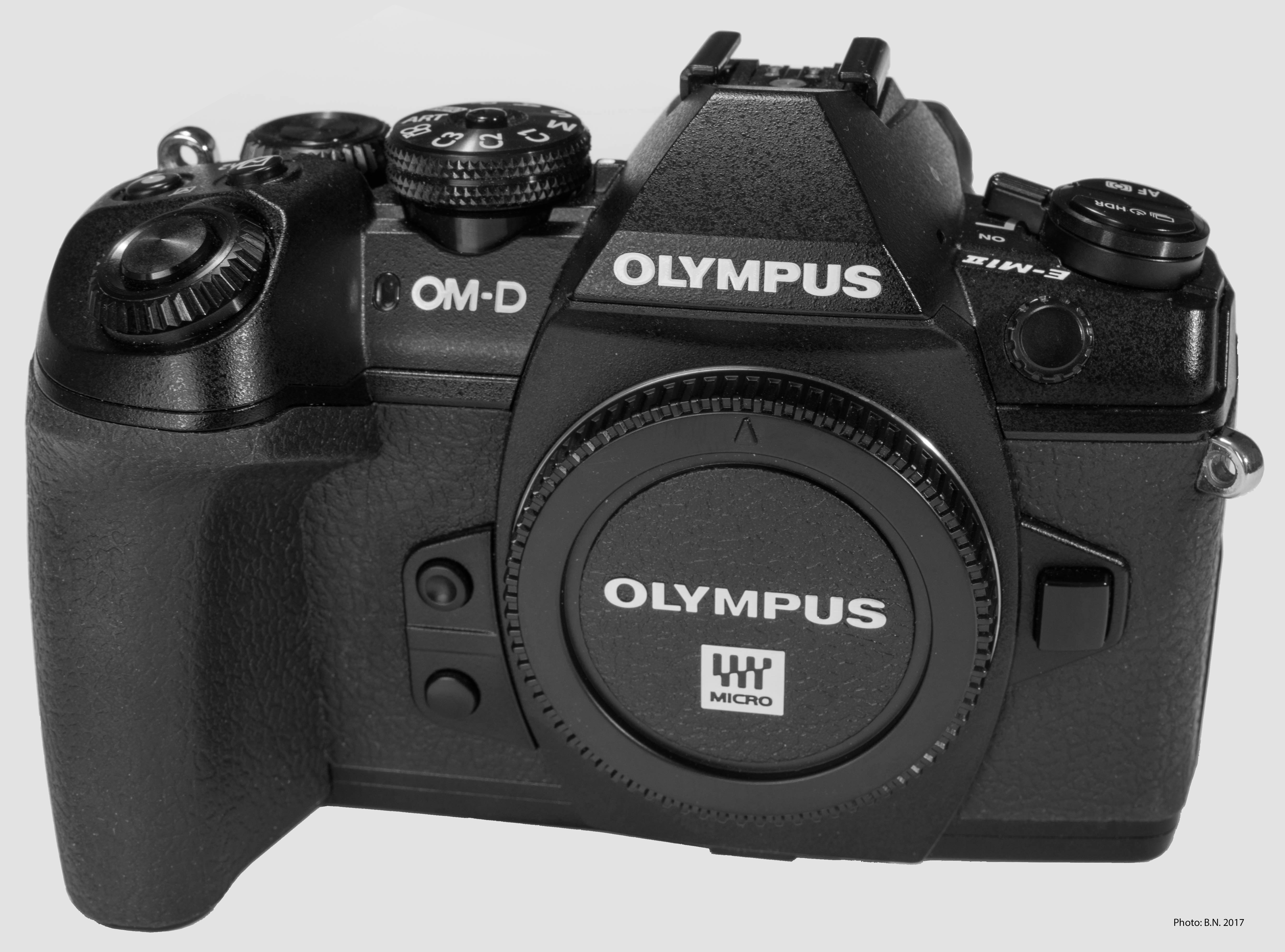
Olympus OM-D E-M1 Mark II

In 2016, the OM-D E-M1 was superseded by the Olympus OM-D E-M1 Mark II. The Mark II features a slightly higher resolution 20 MP Live MOS sensor. The Mark II also has substantially faster auto focus—according to the manufacturer, six times faster upon first focus acquisition than the original E-M1. The camera also has a 60 fps max shooting rate in Pro Capture mode using the electronic shutter, and vibration reduction technology in lenses as well as in camera.

Brand	Form	Class	2008	2009	2010	2011			2012	2013	2014	2015	2016	2017	2018	2019	2020	2021	2022	2023	2024	2025	2026
Olympus	SLR style OM-D	Professional															E-M1X ^{R}						
Olympus	SLR style OM-D	High-end									E-M1			E-M1 II ^{R}			E-M1 III ^{R}						
Olympus	SLR style OM-D	Advanced							E-M5			E-M5 II ^{R}					E-M5 III ^{R}						
Olympus	SLR style OM-D	Mid-range									E-M10		E-M10 II		E-M10 III			E-M10 IV					
Olympus	Rangefinder style PEN	Mid-range		E-P1	E-P2		E-P3				E-P5		PEN-F ^{R}										
Olympus	Rangefinder style PEN	Upper-entry			E-PL1	E-PL2		E-PL3	E-PL5		E-PL6	E-PL7		E-PL8	E-PL9		E-PL10						
Olympus	Rangefinder style PEN	Entry-level					E-PM1		E-PM2														
Olympus	remote													Air									
OM System	SLR style	Professional																	OM-1 ^{R}		OM-1 II ^{R}		
OM System	SLR style	High-end																				OM-3 ^{R}	
OM System	SLR style	Advanced																		OM-5 ^{R}			OM-5 II ^{R}
OM System	PEN	Mid-range																	E-P7				
Panasonic	SLR style	High-end Video													GH5S				GH6 ^{R}			GH7 ^{R}	
Panasonic	SLR style	High-end Photo													G9 ^{R}						G9 II ^{R}		
Panasonic	SLR style	High-end		GH1		GH2			GH3		GH4				GH5				GH5II				
Panasonic	SLR style	Mid-range		G1	G2		G3		G5		G6		G7	G80/G85			G90/G95						
Panasonic	SLR style	Entry-level			G10													G100			G100D		
Panasonic	Rangefinder style	Advanced							GX1		GX7		GX8		GX9								
Panasonic	Rangefinder style	Mid-range									GM1	GM5	GX80/GX85										
Panasonic	Rangefinder style	Entry-level			GF1	GF2	GF3		GF5		GF6	GF7	GF8	GX800/GX850/GF9		GX880/GF10/GF90							
Panasonic	Camcorder	Professional							AG-AF104														
Kodak	Rangefinder style	Entry-level										S-1											
DJI	Drone	.												Zenmuse X5S									
DJI	Drone	.												Zenmuse X5									
YI	Rangefinder style	Entry-level												M1									
Yongnuo	Rangefinder style	Android camera															YN450M		YN455				
Blackmagic Design	Rangefinder style	High-End Video							Cinema Camera														
Blackmagic Design	Rangefinder style	High-End Video									Pocket Cinema Camera					Pocket Cinema Camera 4K							
Blackmagic Design		High-End Video										Micro Cinema Camera									Micro Studio Camera 4K G2		
Z CAM	Cinema	Advanced											E1			E2							
Z CAM	Cinema	Mid-Range																E2-M4					
Z CAM	Cinema	Entry-Level															E2C						
JVC	Camcorder	Professional										GY-LS300											
SVS-Vistek		Industrial							EVO Tracer														
