= Olympus OM-D E-M1 Mark III =

Digital mirrorless camera

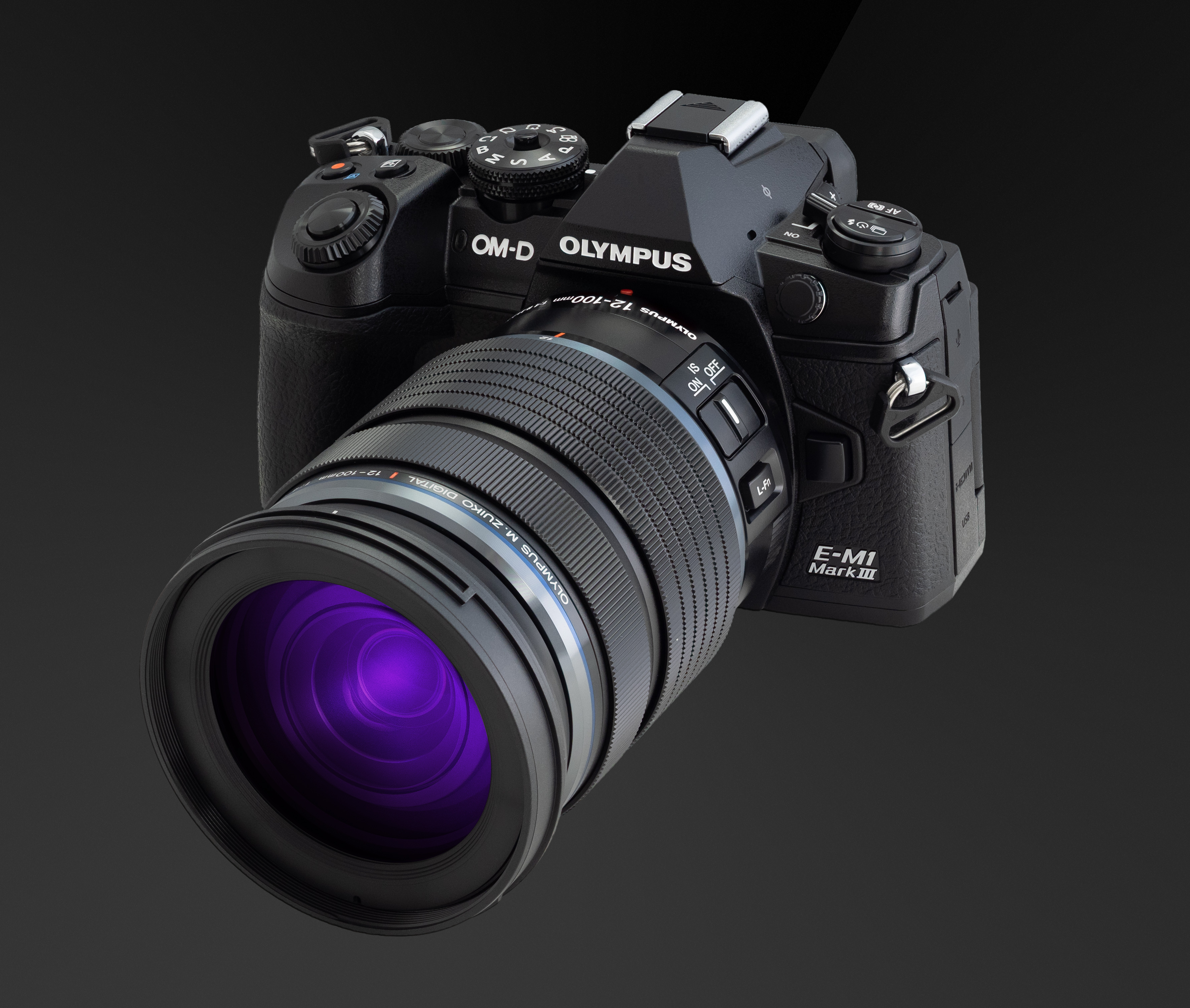
- OM-D E-M1 Mark III with M.Zuiko 12-100

Overview
- Maker: Olympus Corporation
- Type: mirrorless interchangeable-lens camera
- Released: February 2020

Lens
- Lens mount: Micro Four Thirds
- Lens: Interchangeable
- Compatible lenses: Panasonic, Leica, Samyang, Tamron, Voigtländer, Yongnuo

Sensor/medium
- Sensor type: Live MOS
- Sensor size: 17.3 x 13mm (Four Thirds type)
- Maximum resolution: 20.37 MP; 50 MP "Hand-Held High Res Shot"; 80 MP Tripod "High Res Shot"
- Film speed: 200–25600, with "LOW ISO 64"
- Recording medium: Dual SD / SDHC / SDXC slots (UHS-II on first slot)

Focusing
- Focus modes: Contrast Detect (sensor), Phase Detect, Multi-area, Center, Selective single-point, Tracking, Single, Continuous, Touch, Face Detection, Live View
- Focus areas: 121 points
- Focus bracketing: Yes

Exposure/metering
- Exposure bracketing: ±5 (at 1/3 EV, 1/2 EV, 1 EV steps)
- Exposure metering: Yes
- Metering modes: Multi, Center-weighted, Spot

Flash
- Flash: Yes (via hot shoe)
- Flash exposure compensation: Redeye, Fill-in, Flash Off, Red-eye Slow sync. (1st curtain), Slow sync. (1st curtain), Slow sync. (2nd curtain), Manual
- Flash synchronization: 1/250 s
- Flash bracketing: Yes
- Compatible flashes: FL-300R; FL-600R; FL-700WR; FL-900R; FL-LM3

Shutter
- Shutter: Electronic and mechanical
- Shutter speeds: 1/32000 – 60 s
- Continuous shooting: 60 fps (in silent mode)

Viewfinder
- Viewfinder: Yes
- Electronic viewfinder: built-in 2.36 MP (with Auto Luminance, 100% coverage)
- Frame coverage: 100%

Image processing
- Image processor: TruePic IX
- White balance: 7 presets, 4 Custom
- WB bracketing: Yes
- Dynamic range bracketing: Yes

General
- Video recording: C4K: 4096 x 2160 @ 24p / 237 Mbps, MOV, H.264, Linear PCM; 4K: 3840×2160, 30/25/24p, 102 Mbps, MOV, H.264, Linear PCM; FHD: 1920 x 1080, 60/50/30/25/24p, MOV, H.264, Linear PCM; HD: 1280×720, Motion JPEG
- LCD screen: tilting 3 inch, 1,040,000 dots (upwards: 80˚, downwards: 50˚)
- Battery: BLN-1 lithium-ion (CIPA 350)
- Optional battery packs: HLD-9 battery grip
- Optional accessories: Remote cable: RM-CB2; Multifunction remote controls: RM-WR1, RM-WR2
- AV ports: Micro HDMI; USB-C (Tethering and Olympus Capture); 3.5mm audio jack (Microphone, Stereo); 3.5mm audio jack (Headphone, Stereo)
- Data ports: USB-C 3.2 Gen 1 (5 GBit/sec); Wireless 802.11a/b/g/n/ac; Bluetooth; 2.5mm stereo jack for remote
- Body features: Magnesium alloy
- Dimensions: 134×91×69 mm (5.3×3.6×2.7 in)
- Weight: 580 g (20 oz) (1.3 lb) including battery and SD card
- Made in: Vietnam

Chronology
- Predecessor: Olympus OM-D E-M1 Mark II
- Successor: OM System OM-1

The Olympus OM-D E-M1 Mark III is the third iteration of the flagship camera in the series of OM-D mirrorless interchangeable-lens cameras produced by Olympus on the Micro Four-Thirds system. Released on February 28, 2020, it replaced the Olympus OM-D E-M1 Mark II.

The E-M1 Mark III follows the E-M1 Mark II in embracing artificial intelligence-based features such as a deep learning autofocus system and multi-shot image processing to simulate neutral-density filters and a hi-res mode that allows the 20-megapixel camera to produce 50-megapixel images while handheld and 80-megapixel images while being on tripod. The camera also includes a 60 frames-per-second continuous shooting mode.

== Features ==
- 20.37-megapixel Micro Four-Thirds sensor
- 121-point autofocus system
- Image stabilization (up to 7.0 EV or up to 7.5 with 'Sync IS' lenses)
- ISO range: 200 to 25600, with "LOW ISO 64"
- Handheld high-resolution shot mode
- Starry Sky AF for Astrophotography
- Up to 60 frames per second
- Multi-shot mode simulates ND filters (ND2, ND4, ND8, ND16, ND32)
- LCD viewfinder
- 3 inch screen
- 420 shots per charge
- Dual SD card slots (1 x UHS-II, 1 x UHS-I)
- 8-way joystick
- IPX1-rated weather sealing
- USB charging

== Compared to the predecessor, Olympus OM-D E-M1 Mark II ==
The Olympus OM-D E-M1 Mark III was introduced 4 years after its official predecessor, the E-M1 Mark II. The Mark III brings several changes, improvements and new features:

- The TruePic IX processor.
  - The Mark II used the TruePic VIII.
- Upgraded shutter, rated for 400,000 actuations.
  - The Mark II's shutter is rated for 200,000 actuations.
- Updated sensor dust reduction system and coating.
- Upgraded In-body image stabilization with up to 7.5 EV with IS compatible lenses and 7.0 EV with other lenses.
  - The Mark II has up to 5.5 EV.
- An upgraded Pro Capture mode with up to 35 pre-shutter frames.
  - The Mark II has up to 14 pre-shutter frames.
- A new High Speed movie recording mode that allows recording 1080p video at up to 120fps.
- A new Handheld High Res Shot (HHHR) mode that allows capturing 50MP images handheld, without the need for a tripod.
- An upgraded High Res Shot (HRS) mode that allows capturing up to 80M images.
  - The Mark II's High Res Shot (HRS) mode can capture up to 50M images.
- A new Starry Sky AF mode that locks focus on stars.
- A new Live ND mode that simulates the use of Neutral-density filters.
- Improved Face / Eye Priority Auto Focus algorithms.
- Custom Auto Focus target areas.
- Auto ISO settings available during recording.
- A new "My Menu". This is a customizable settings menu containing only items you select.
- USB-C battery charging (with a supported USB-C PD device and cable).
  - If configured, the camera can alternatively be powered directly via USB-C (without charging the battery, although it still needs to be present and hold over 10% charge). The HDMI output of the camera does not work during direct USB-C charging.
- A joystick has been added to the back of the camera. Useful for navigating menus and quickly changing Auto Focus areas.
- The menu button on the back of the camera has been moved from the bottom right to the top left.
- The Fn1 button on the back of the camera has been changed to an ISO button.
- For the mode dial on the top of the camera, a fourth custom mode (C4) has been added along with a Bulb (B) mode. The ART and iAUTO modes have been removed from the dial.
- The flash can be controlled wirelessly over radio.
- Over Wi-Fi on PC, the camera can be controlled and images can be transferred.
- Bluetooth v4.2 (supports BLE) has been added. It lets you connect your phone to the camera through the io.Share app without having to connect to the Wi-Fi access point first.

== Hi-resolution shot mode ==
In tripod and handheld mode, the camera rapidly captures 8 images (Tripod) or 16 images (Handheld) which are combined into 160 Mpx (tripod) or 320 MPx (handheld) of data, which the camera combines into 80 MPx (10368×7776 px) images in tripod mode or 50 MPx (8160×6120 px) image in handheld mode. The tripod mode ISO limit is 1600, or ISO 6400 in handheld mode. Hi-resolution pictures can be saved just in JPEG format. Handhold exposure can be set up to 4 seconds.

The benefit of hi-res mode is bigger resolution, low noise and an increase of dynamic range.

== Reception ==
The E-M1 Mark III was generally favored for improvements made over the Mark II, such as the introduction of a handheld mode and a lower base cost.

The camera took criticism for including the same 20-megapixel sensor, electronic viewfinder, and screen, as its predecessor, the Mark II. The same sensor is also present in the enthusiast-level Olympus OM-D E-M5 Mark III which was released just months earlier.

Brand	Form	Class	2008	2009	2010	2011			2012	2013	2014	2015	2016	2017	2018	2019	2020	2021	2022	2023	2024	2025	2026
Olympus	SLR style OM-D	Professional															E-M1X ^{R}						
Olympus	SLR style OM-D	High-end									E-M1			E-M1 II ^{R}			E-M1 III ^{R}						
Olympus	SLR style OM-D	Advanced							E-M5			E-M5 II ^{R}					E-M5 III ^{R}						
Olympus	SLR style OM-D	Mid-range									E-M10		E-M10 II		E-M10 III			E-M10 IV					
Olympus	Rangefinder style PEN	Mid-range		E-P1	E-P2		E-P3				E-P5		PEN-F ^{R}										
Olympus	Rangefinder style PEN	Upper-entry			E-PL1	E-PL2		E-PL3	E-PL5		E-PL6	E-PL7		E-PL8	E-PL9		E-PL10						
Olympus	Rangefinder style PEN	Entry-level					E-PM1		E-PM2														
Olympus	remote													Air									
OM System	SLR style	Professional																	OM-1 ^{R}		OM-1 II ^{R}		
OM System	SLR style	High-end																				OM-3 ^{R}	
OM System	SLR style	Advanced																		OM-5 ^{R}			OM-5 II ^{R}
OM System	PEN	Mid-range																	E-P7				
Panasonic	SLR style	High-end Video													GH5S				GH6 ^{R}			GH7 ^{R}	
Panasonic	SLR style	High-end Photo													G9 ^{R}						G9 II ^{R}		
Panasonic	SLR style	High-end		GH1		GH2			GH3		GH4				GH5				GH5II				
Panasonic	SLR style	Mid-range		G1	G2		G3		G5		G6		G7	G80/G85			G90/G95						
Panasonic	SLR style	Entry-level			G10													G100			G100D		
Panasonic	Rangefinder style	Advanced							GX1		GX7		GX8		GX9								
Panasonic	Rangefinder style	Mid-range									GM1	GM5	GX80/GX85										
Panasonic	Rangefinder style	Entry-level			GF1	GF2	GF3		GF5		GF6	GF7	GF8	GX800/GX850/GF9		GX880/GF10/GF90							
Panasonic	Camcorder	Professional							AG-AF104														
Kodak	Rangefinder style	Entry-level										S-1											
DJI	Drone	.												Zenmuse X5S									
DJI	Drone	.												Zenmuse X5									
YI	Rangefinder style	Entry-level												M1									
Yongnuo	Rangefinder style	Android camera															YN450M		YN455				
Blackmagic Design	Rangefinder style	High-End Video							Cinema Camera														
Blackmagic Design	Rangefinder style	High-End Video									Pocket Cinema Camera					Pocket Cinema Camera 4K							
Blackmagic Design		High-End Video										Micro Cinema Camera									Micro Studio Camera 4K G2		
Z CAM	Cinema	Advanced											E1			E2							
Z CAM	Cinema	Mid-Range																E2-M4					
Z CAM	Cinema	Entry-Level															E2C						
JVC	Camcorder	Professional										GY-LS300											
SVS-Vistek		Industrial							EVO Tracer														
