= Olympus OM-D E-M1 Mark II =

Digital mirrorless camera

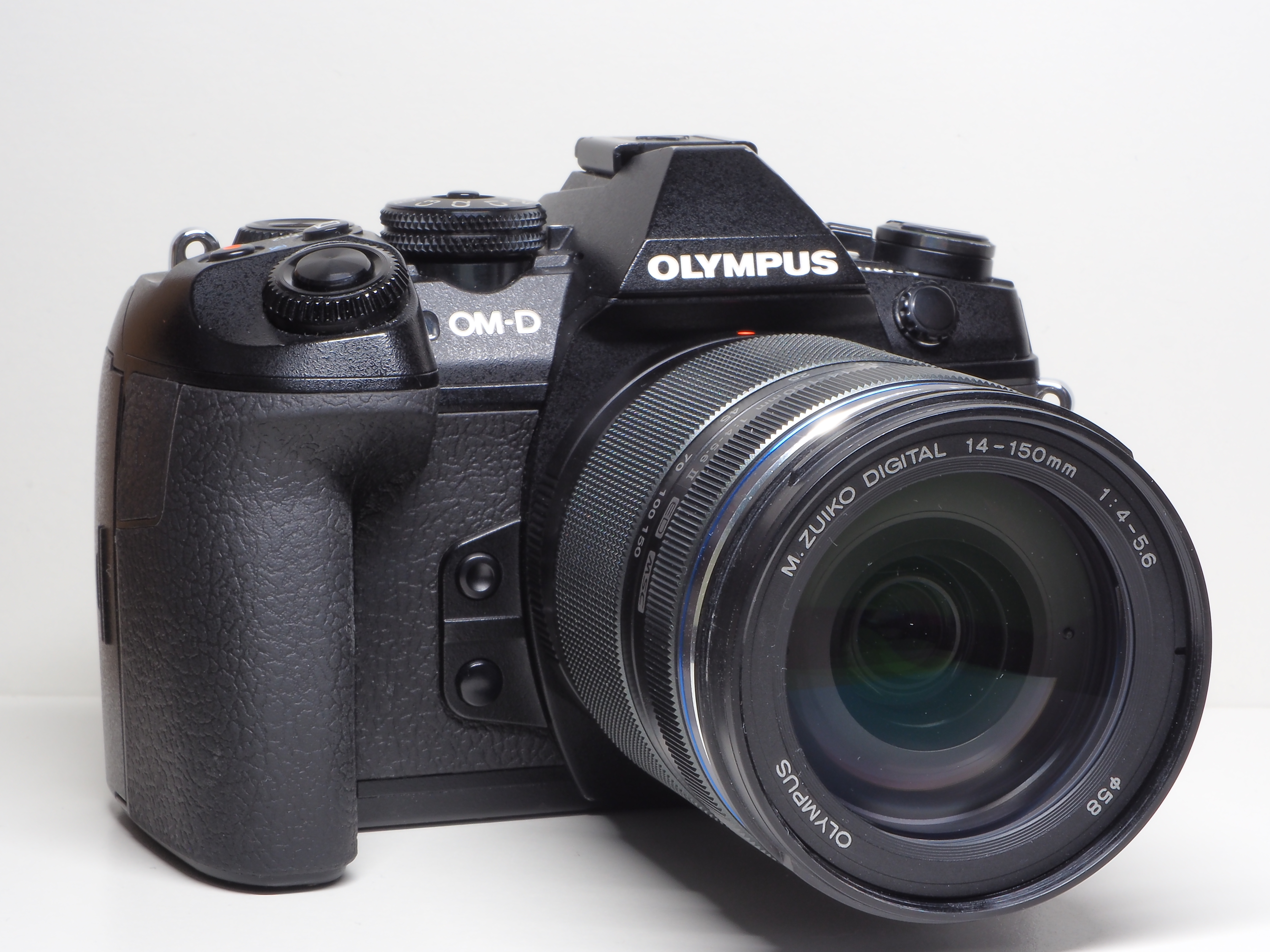
- OM-D E-M1 Mark II with M.Zuiko 14-150

Overview
- Maker: Olympus Corporation
- Type: mirrorless interchangeable-lens camera
- Released: December 2016

Lens
- Lens mount: Micro Four Thirds
- Lens: Interchangeable
- Compatible lenses: Panasonic, Leica, Samyang, Tamron, Voigtländer, Yongnuo

Sensor/medium
- Sensor type: Live MOS
- Sensor size: 17.3 x 13mm (Four Thirds type)
- Maximum resolution: 20.37 MP; 50 MP "High Res Shot"
- Film speed: 200–25600, with "LOW ISO 64"
- Recording medium: Dual SD / SDHC / SDXC slots (UHS-II on first slot)

Focusing
- Focus modes: Contrast Detect (sensor), Phase Detect, Multi-area, Center, Selective single-point, Tracking, Single, Continuous, Touch, Face Detection, Live View
- Focus areas: 121 focus points
- Focus bracketing: Yes

Exposure/metering
- Exposure bracketing: ±5 (at 1/3 EV, 1/2 EV, 1 EV steps)
- Exposure metering: Yes
- Metering modes: Multi, Center-weighted, Spot

Flash
- Flash: Yes (via hot shoe)
- Flash exposure compensation: Redeye, Fill-in, Flash Off, Red-eye Slow sync. (1st curtain), Slow sync. (1st curtain), Slow sync. (2nd curtain), Manual
- Flash synchronization: 1/250 s
- Flash bracketing: Yes
- Compatible flashes: FL-300R; FL-600R; FL-700WR; FL-900R; FL-LM3

Shutter
- Shutter: Electronic and mechanical
- Shutter speeds: 1/32000s to 60s
- Continuous shooting: 60 fps (in silent mode)

Viewfinder
- Viewfinder: Yes
- Electronic viewfinder: built-in 2.36 MP (with Auto Luminance, 100% coverage)
- Frame coverage: 100%

Image processing
- Image processor: TruePic VIII
- White balance: 7 presets, 4 Custom
- WB bracketing: Yes
- Dynamic range bracketing: Yes

General
- Video recording: C4K: 4096×2160, 24p, ~237 Mbps, MOV, H.264, Linear PCM; 4K: 3840×2160, 30/25/24p, ~102 Mbps, MOV, H.264, Linear PCM; FHD: 1920×1080, 60/50/30/25/24p, MOV, H.264, Linear PCM; HD: 1280×720, Motion JPEG
- LCD screen: tilting 3 inch, 1,040,000 dots (upwards: 80˚, downwards: 50˚)
- Battery: BLH-1 lithium-ion (CIPA 350)
- Optional battery packs: HLD-9 battery grip
- Optional accessories: Remote cable: RM-CB2; Multifunction remote controls: RM-WR1, RM-WR2
- AV ports: Micro HDMI; USB-C (Tethering and Olympus Capture); 3.5mm audio jack (Microphone, Stereo); 3.5mm audio jack (Headphone, Stereo)
- Data ports: USB-C 3.1 Gen 1; WiFi 802.11b/g/n; 2.5mm stereo jack for remote
- Body features: Magnesium alloy
- Dimensions: 134×91×69 mm (5.3×3.6×2.7 in)
- Weight: 574 g (20 oz) (1.3 lb) including battery and SD card
- Made in: Vietnam

Chronology
- Predecessor: Olympus OM-D E-M1
- Successor: Olympus OM-D E-M1 Mark III

The Olympus OM-D E-M1 Mark II is a digital mirrorless interchangeable-lens camera released by Olympus Corporation in December 2016. It replaced the Olympus OM-D E-M1, which was introduced in 2013.

== Features include ==
- 20.37-megapixel Micro Four-Thirds sensor.
- 5-axis In-Body Image Stabilization
- High resolution mode: With the IBIS pixel shift technology, the camera can take a 50 MP image
- Sensitivity range of ISO 100-25600.
- Dual SD card slots, one with UHS-II support.
- TruePic VIII processor.
- Silent mode: Only uses electronic shutter.
- 121 phase detection auto focus points.
- Movie recording in DCI 4K (4096x2160), UHD 4K (3840x2160) or Full HD (1920x1080).
- 60 fps burst rate in silent mode.
- Micro Four Thirds lens mount.
- No built-in flash
- Pro capture
- Weather sealed, magnesium alloy body.

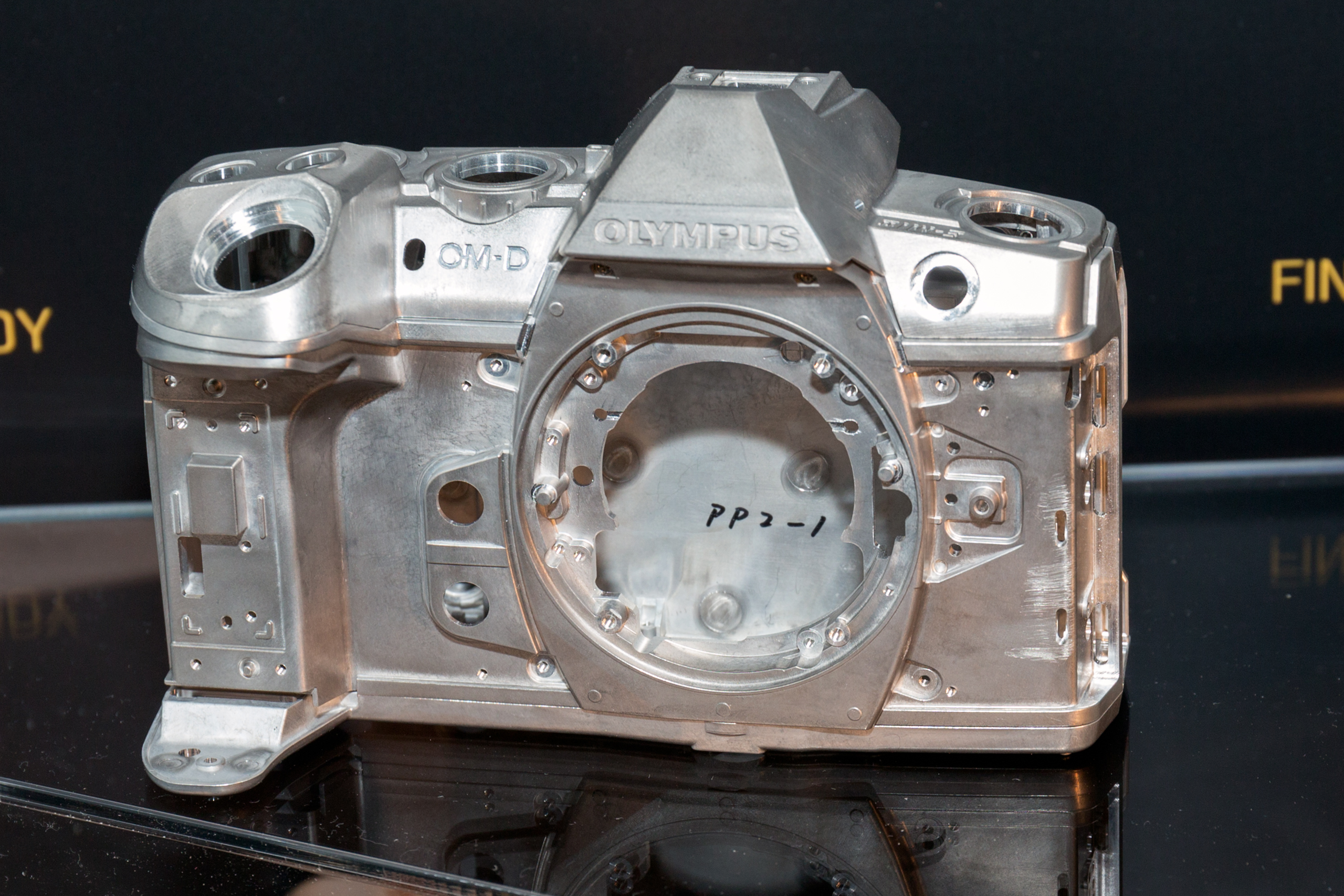
The E-M1 Mark II body without any paint and rubber grip installed.

- Electronic viewfinder with a 2,360,000 dots resolution.

== Compared to the predecessor, Olympus OM-D E-M1 ==
The Olympus OM-D E-M1 Mark II was introduced 3 years after its official predecessor, the regular E-M1. The E-M1 lacks the High Resolution mode, and also the 4K movie recording feature, which the Mark II has. The Mark II only has phase detection AF points, the regular E-M1 has both contrast- and phase detection AF points, but it can only use one type at once. According to Olympus, the Mark II's autofocus is six times faster and also more accurate than its predecessor's. The older model only has one memory card slot, the Mark II has two, and it supports UHS-II also, unlike the E-M1. The Mark II has a slightly larger and differently textured grip.

The E-M1 Mark II won "Camera of the Year" in the Camera Grand Prix 2017.

In January 2019, Olympus announced its new flagship Olympus OM-D E-M1X, which is intended for professional use.

In February 2020, Olympus announced the OM-D E-M1 Mark III, the successor to the E-M1 Mark II.

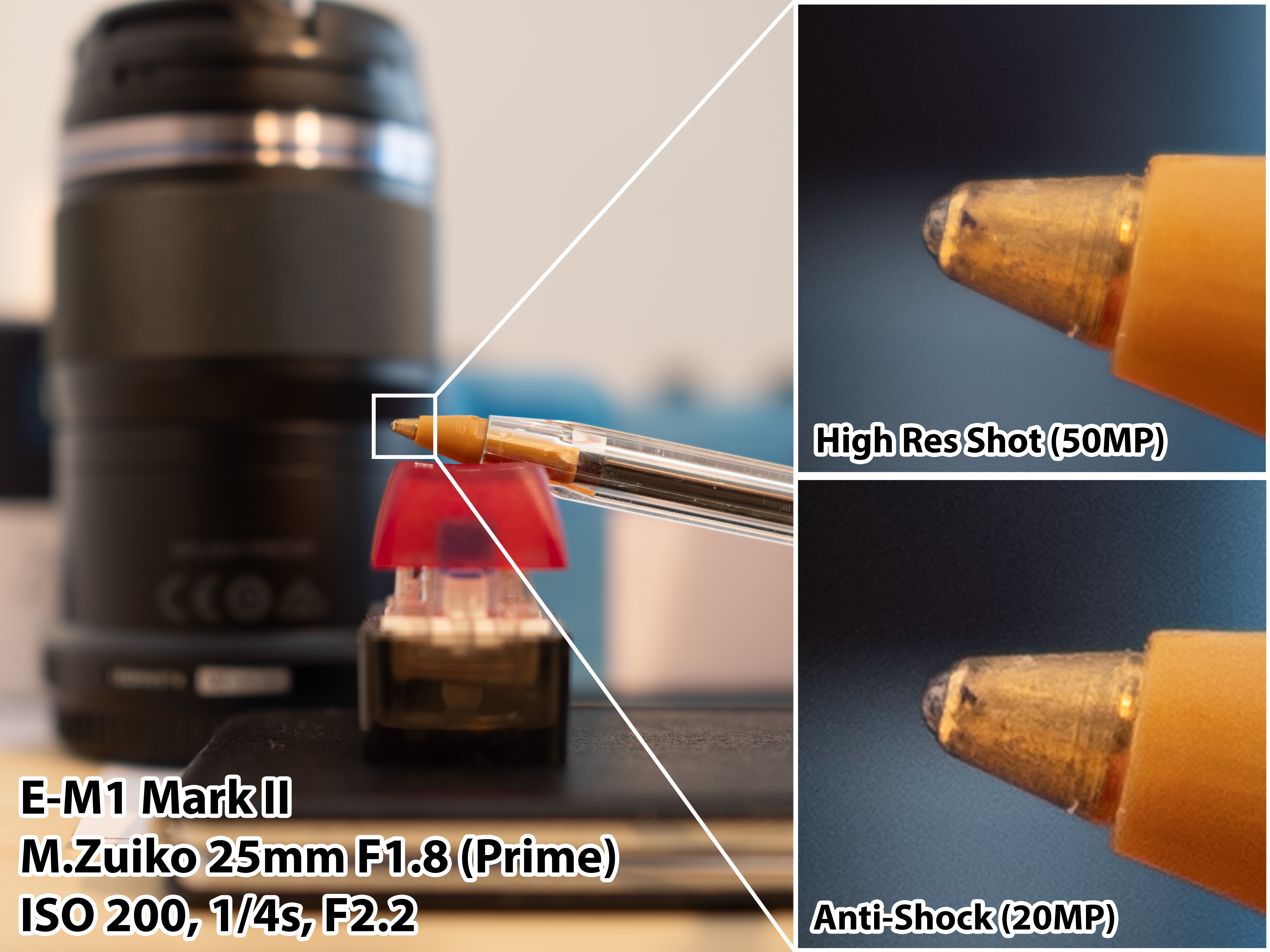
Diagram comparing the E-M1 Mark II's High Res Shot mode against a typical shot made using the Anti-Shock mode.

Brand	Form	Class	2008	2009	2010	2011			2012	2013	2014	2015	2016	2017	2018	2019	2020	2021	2022	2023	2024	2025	2026
Olympus	SLR style OM-D	Professional															E-M1X ^{R}						
Olympus	SLR style OM-D	High-end									E-M1			E-M1 II ^{R}			E-M1 III ^{R}						
Olympus	SLR style OM-D	Advanced							E-M5			E-M5 II ^{R}					E-M5 III ^{R}						
Olympus	SLR style OM-D	Mid-range									E-M10		E-M10 II		E-M10 III			E-M10 IV					
Olympus	Rangefinder style PEN	Mid-range		E-P1	E-P2		E-P3				E-P5		PEN-F ^{R}										
Olympus	Rangefinder style PEN	Upper-entry			E-PL1	E-PL2		E-PL3	E-PL5		E-PL6	E-PL7		E-PL8	E-PL9		E-PL10						
Olympus	Rangefinder style PEN	Entry-level					E-PM1		E-PM2														
Olympus	remote													Air									
OM System	SLR style	Professional																	OM-1 ^{R}		OM-1 II ^{R}		
OM System	SLR style	High-end																				OM-3 ^{R}	
OM System	SLR style	Advanced																		OM-5 ^{R}			OM-5 II ^{R}
OM System	PEN	Mid-range																	E-P7				
Panasonic	SLR style	High-end Video													GH5S				GH6 ^{R}			GH7 ^{R}	
Panasonic	SLR style	High-end Photo													G9 ^{R}						G9 II ^{R}		
Panasonic	SLR style	High-end		GH1		GH2			GH3		GH4				GH5				GH5II				
Panasonic	SLR style	Mid-range		G1	G2		G3		G5		G6		G7	G80/G85			G90/G95						
Panasonic	SLR style	Entry-level			G10													G100			G100D		
Panasonic	Rangefinder style	Advanced							GX1		GX7		GX8		GX9								
Panasonic	Rangefinder style	Mid-range									GM1	GM5	GX80/GX85										
Panasonic	Rangefinder style	Entry-level			GF1	GF2	GF3		GF5		GF6	GF7	GF8	GX800/GX850/GF9		GX880/GF10/GF90							
Panasonic	Camcorder	Professional							AG-AF104														
Kodak	Rangefinder style	Entry-level										S-1											
DJI	Drone	.												Zenmuse X5S									
DJI	Drone	.												Zenmuse X5									
YI	Rangefinder style	Entry-level												M1									
Yongnuo	Rangefinder style	Android camera															YN450M		YN455				
Blackmagic Design	Rangefinder style	High-End Video							Cinema Camera														
Blackmagic Design	Rangefinder style	High-End Video									Pocket Cinema Camera					Pocket Cinema Camera 4K							
Blackmagic Design		High-End Video										Micro Cinema Camera									Micro Studio Camera 4K G2		
Z CAM	Cinema	Advanced											E1			E2							
Z CAM	Cinema	Mid-Range																E2-M4					
Z CAM	Cinema	Entry-Level															E2C						
JVC	Camcorder	Professional										GY-LS300											
SVS-Vistek		Industrial							EVO Tracer														
