= Olympus OM-D E-M1X =

Mirrorless camera model

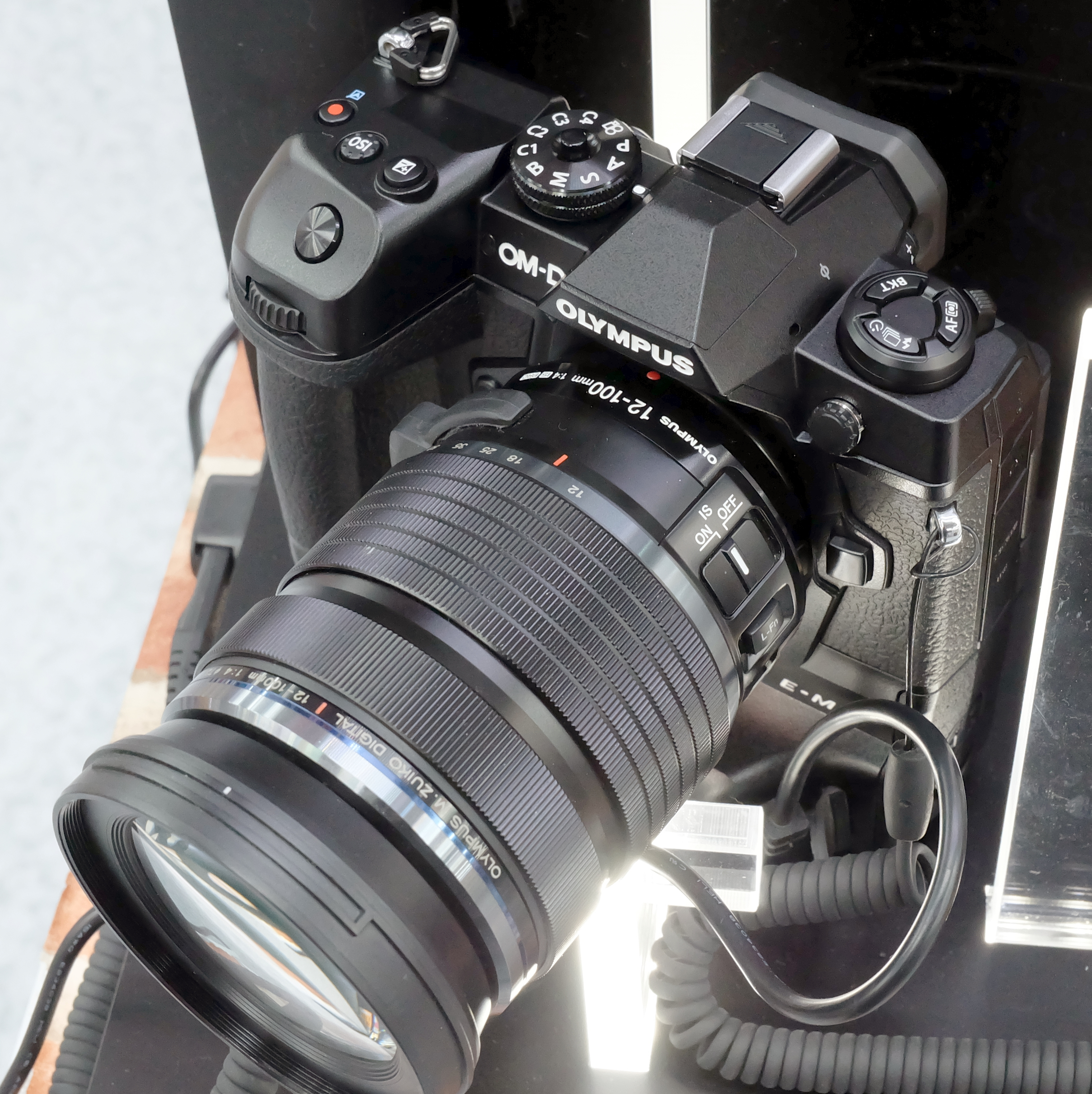

Overview
- Maker: Olympus
- Type: Mirrorless Interchangeable Lens Camera
- Released: 2019 Feb 22

Lens
- Lens mount: Micro Four Thirds

Sensor/medium
- Sensor type: Live MOS
- Sensor size: 17.3 x 13mm (Four Thirds type)
- Sensor maker: Sony
- Maximum resolution: 20.4 megapixels 50 megapixels (High Res Handheld); 80 megapixels (High Res Tripod)
- Film speed: 100-25600
- Recording medium: SD, SDHC or SDXC memory card dual slot

Focusing
- Focus areas: 121 focus points

Shutter
- Shutter speeds: 1/8000 to 60s (mechanical); 1/32000s to 60s (electronic)
- Continuous shooting: 15 fps (mechanical); 60 fps (electronic)

Viewfinder
- Viewfinder magnification: 1.48x-1.65x
- Frame coverage: 100%

Image processing
- Image processor: 2 × TruePic VIII
- White balance: Yes

General
- Video recording: C4K: 4096×2160, 24p, ~237 Mbps; 4K: 3840×2160, 30/25/24p, ~102 Mbps; FHD: 1920×1080, 60/50/30/25/24p HD: 1280×720
- LCD screen: 3 inches with 1,037,000 dots Vari-angle
- Data port(s): USB Type-C (USB3.0); Micro HDMI (type D); WiFi 802.11a/b/g/n/ac 2.5mm stereo jack for remote 3.5mm stereo jack for microphone 3.5mm stereo jack for audio
- Dimensions: 144×147×75 mm (5.7×5.8×3.0 in)
- Weight: 849 g (30 oz) (body only); 997g (including two batteries and two memory cards)
- Made in: Vietnam

Chronology
- Predecessor: Olympus OM-D E-M1 Mark II
- Successor: OM System OM-1

The Olympus OM-D E-M1X is a professional mirrorless interchangeable-lens camera announced by Olympus Corporation in January 2019.

It succeeds the Olympus OM-D E-M1 Mark II, and includes dual TruePic VIII processor, liquid cooling, larger body with an integrated vertical grip with dials, dual batteries, 80 MP tripod composite shot mode, 50 MP handheld composite shot mode, field sensors, improved autofocus tracking, USB power and better built-in stabilization among its improvements.

Reviewers praise the "High Res" mode which allows to captures medium format resolution photos using the sensor-shift method even without a tripod.

Using two TruePic processors (having four cores each) allows E-M1X to use an improved autofocus algorithm developed by deep learning technique.

OM-D E-M1X won Camera Grand Prix 2019 Readers Award.

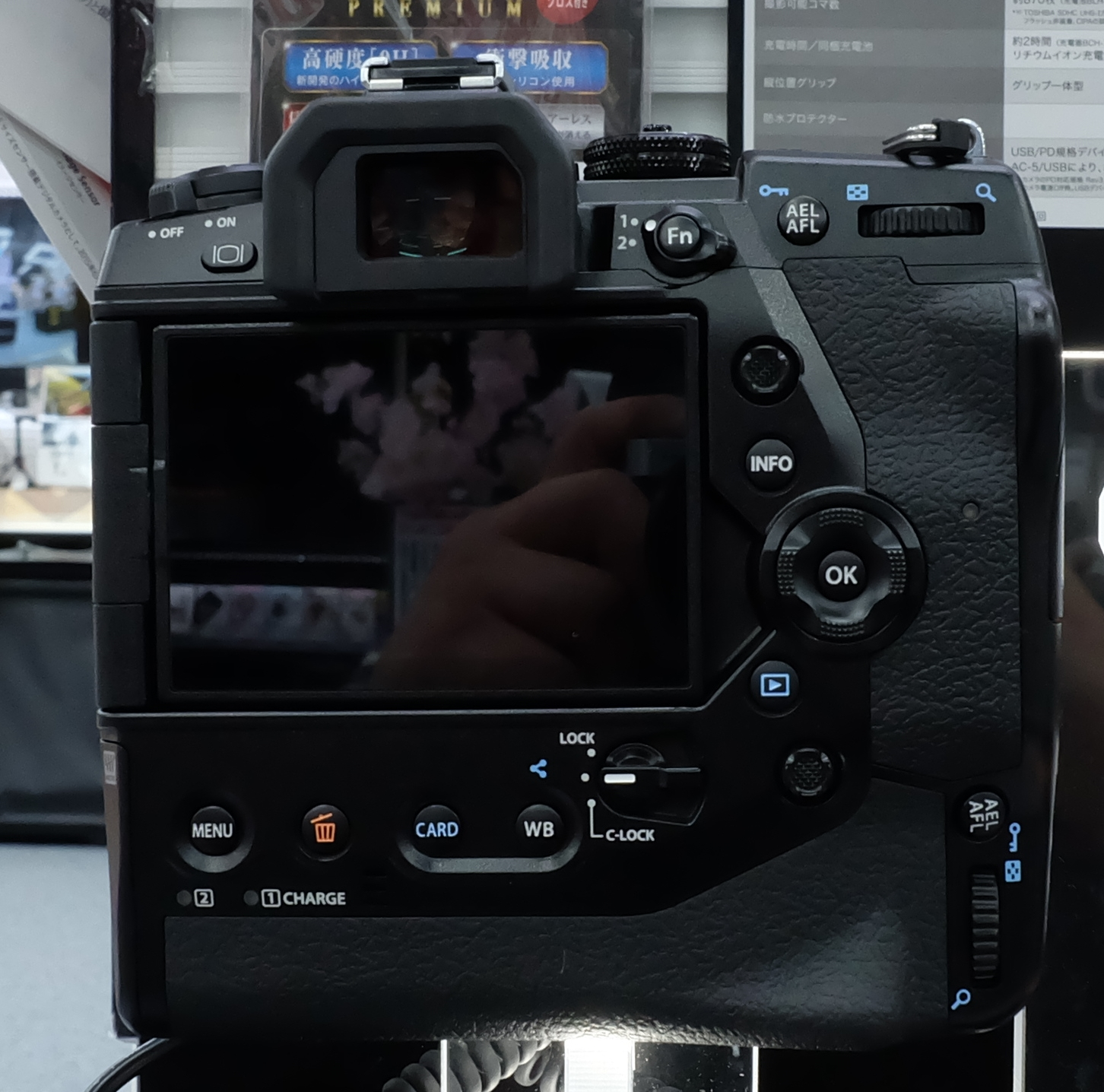
E-M1X features a portrait grip for professional use, but it also has the largest and heaviest body among all Micro Four Thirds cameras to date.

Brand	Form	Class	2008	2009	2010	2011			2012	2013	2014	2015	2016	2017	2018	2019	2020	2021	2022	2023	2024	25
Olympus	SLR style OM-D	Professional															E-M1X ^{R}					
Olympus	SLR style OM-D	High-end									E-M1			E-M1 II ^{R}			E-M1 III ^{R}					
Olympus	SLR style OM-D	Advanced							E-M5			E-M5 II ^{R}					E-M5 III ^{R}					
Olympus	SLR style OM-D	Mid-range									E-M10		E-M10 II		E-M10 III			E-M10 IV				
Olympus	Rangefinder style PEN	Mid-range		E-P1	E-P2		E-P3				E-P5		PEN-F ^{R}									
Olympus	Rangefinder style PEN	Upper-entry			E-PL1	E-PL2		E-PL3	E-PL5		E-PL6	E-PL7		E-PL8	E-PL9		E-PL10					
Olympus	Rangefinder style PEN	Entry-level					E-PM1		E-PM2													
Olympus	remote													Air								
OM System	SLR style	Professional																	OM-1 ^{R}		OM-1 II ^{R}	
OM System	SLR style	High-end																				OM-3 ^{R}
OM System	SLR style	Advanced																		OM-5 ^{R}		
OM System	PEN	Mid-range																	E-P7			
Panasonic	SLR style	High-end Video													GH5S				GH6 ^{R}			GH7 ^{R}
Panasonic	SLR style	High-end Photo													G9 ^{R}						G9 II ^{R}	
Panasonic	SLR style	High-end		GH1		GH2			GH3		GH4				GH5				GH5II			
Panasonic	SLR style	Mid-range		G1	G2		G3		G5		G6		G7	G80/G85			G90/G95					
Panasonic	SLR style	Entry-level			G10													G100			G100D	
Panasonic	Rangefinder style	Advanced							GX1		GX7		GX8		GX9							
Panasonic	Rangefinder style	Mid-range									GM1	GM5	GX80/GX85									
Panasonic	Rangefinder style	Entry-level			GF1	GF2	GF3		GF5		GF6	GF7	GF8	GX800/GX850/GF9		GX880/GF10/GF90						
Panasonic	Camcorder	Professional							AG-AF104													
Kodak	Rangefinder style	Entry-level										S-1										
DJI	Drone	.												Zenmuse X5S								
DJI	Drone	.												Zenmuse X5								
YI	Rangefinder style	Entry-level												M1								
Yongnuo	Rangefinder style	Android camera															YN450M		YN455			
Blackmagic Design	Rangefinder style	High-End Video							Cinema Camera													
Blackmagic Design	Rangefinder style	High-End Video									Pocket Cinema Camera					Pocket Cinema Camera 4K						
Blackmagic Design		High-End Video										Micro Cinema Camera									Micro Studio Camera 4K G2	
Z CAM	Cinema	Advanced											E1			E2						
Z CAM	Cinema	Mid-Range																E2-M4				
Z CAM	Cinema	Entry-Level															E2C					
JVC	Camcorder	Professional										GY-LS300										
SVS-Vistek		Industrial							EVO Tracer													
