= AV input =

Connector label for audio and visual signals

AV input stands for Audio/Visual input, which is a common label on a connector to receive (AV) audio/visual signals from electronic equipment that generates AV signals (AV output).

These terminals are commonly found on such equipment as a television, DVD recorder or VHS recorder, and typically take input from a DVD player, a TV tuner, VHS recorder or camcorder.

== Types of plugs used for video input ==
- Composite video
  - RCA connector
  - BNC connector
  - UHF connector
  - 1/8 inch minijack phone connector
- S-video
  - DIN plug (also used for Apple Desktop Bus)
- Component video
  - RCA connector
  - RGBHV
- Digital video
  - HDMI (High Definition Multimedia Interface)
  - DVI (Digital Video Interface)
  - IEEE 1394 (FireWire)
  - SPDIF (Sony Philips Digital Interface)
