= Yongnuo =

Chinese photographic equipment manufacturer

Shenzhen Yongnuo Photographic Equipment Co., Ltd.
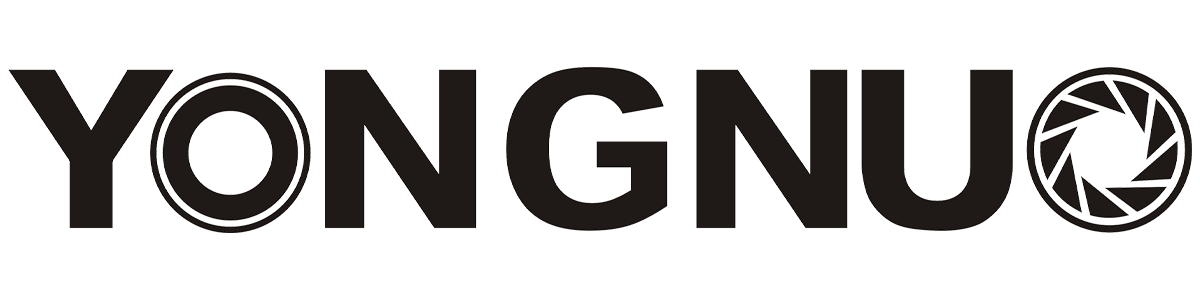

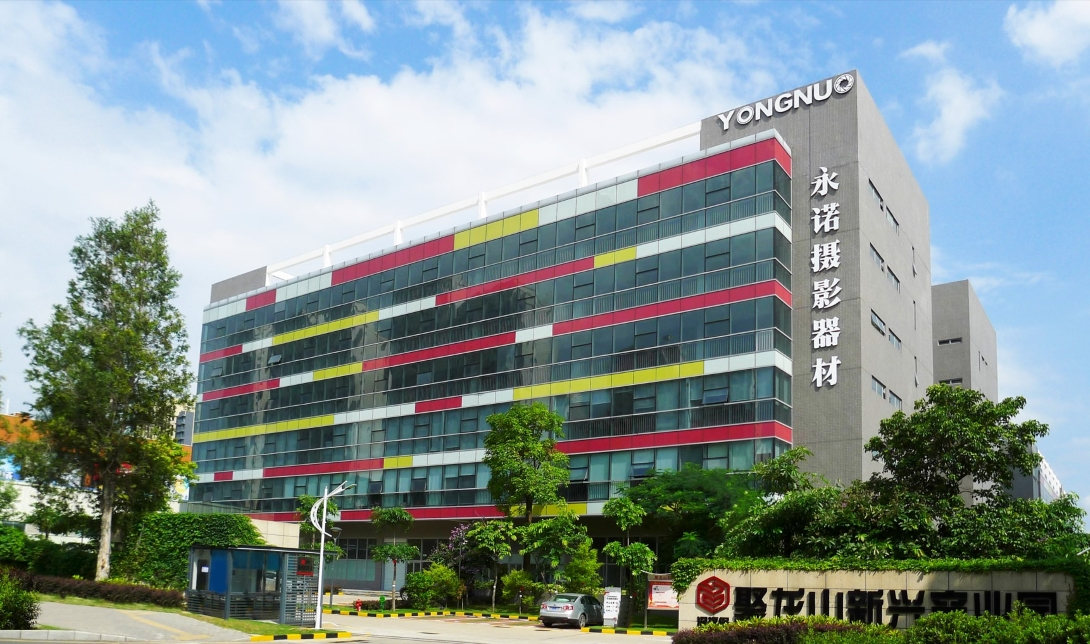
- Native name: 深圳市永诺摄影器材股份有限公司
- Industry: Photographic equipment
- Founded: 2006
- Headquarters: Shenzhen, China
- Products: Smart Camera, Lenses, LED Video Light, Flash Speedlite, Flash Trigger, Microphone, Softbox, and other accessories.
- Brands: YONGNUO
- Number of employees: 501 - 1000 People
- Website: https://th.hkyongnuo.com

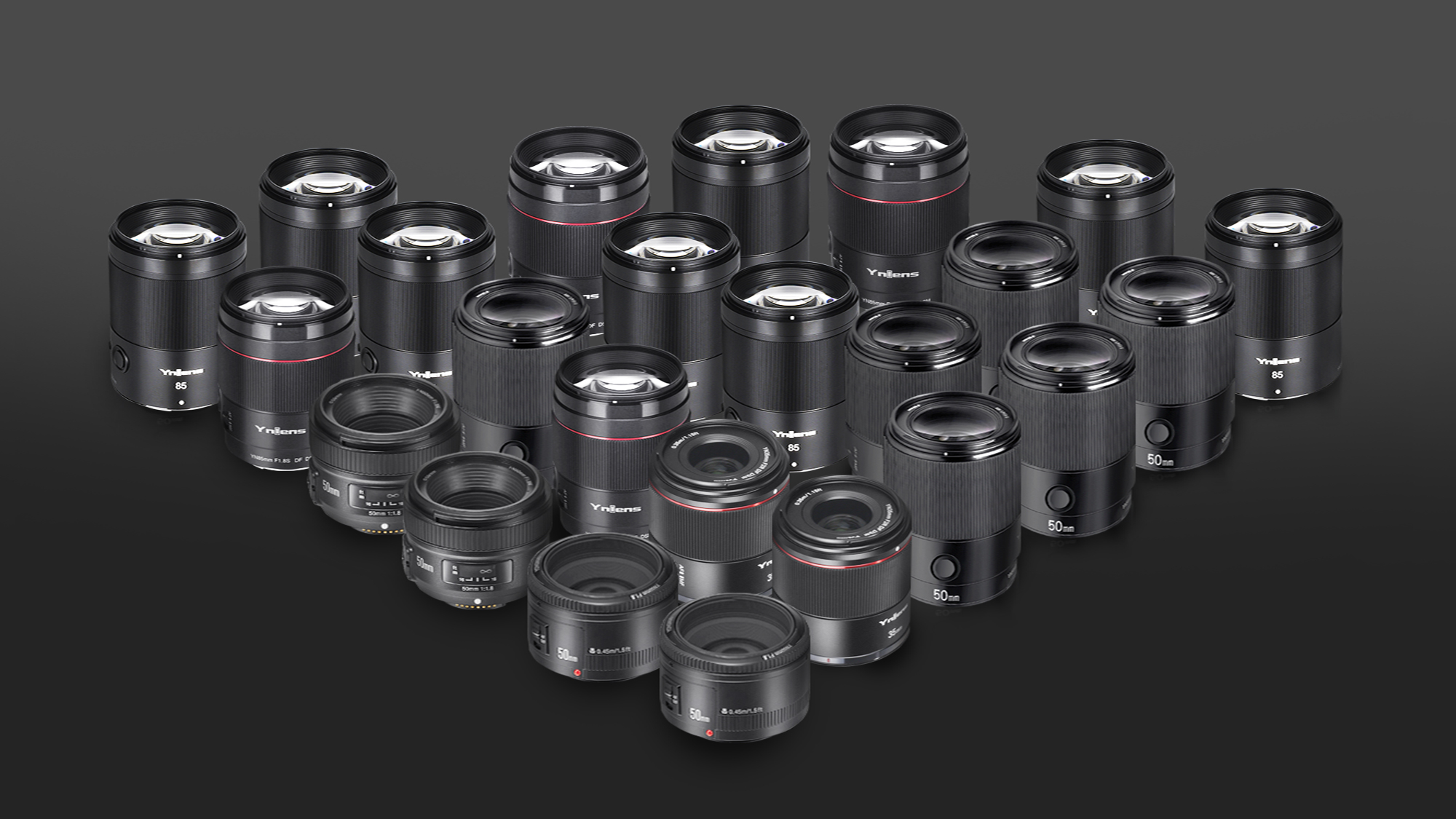
YONGNUO lenses

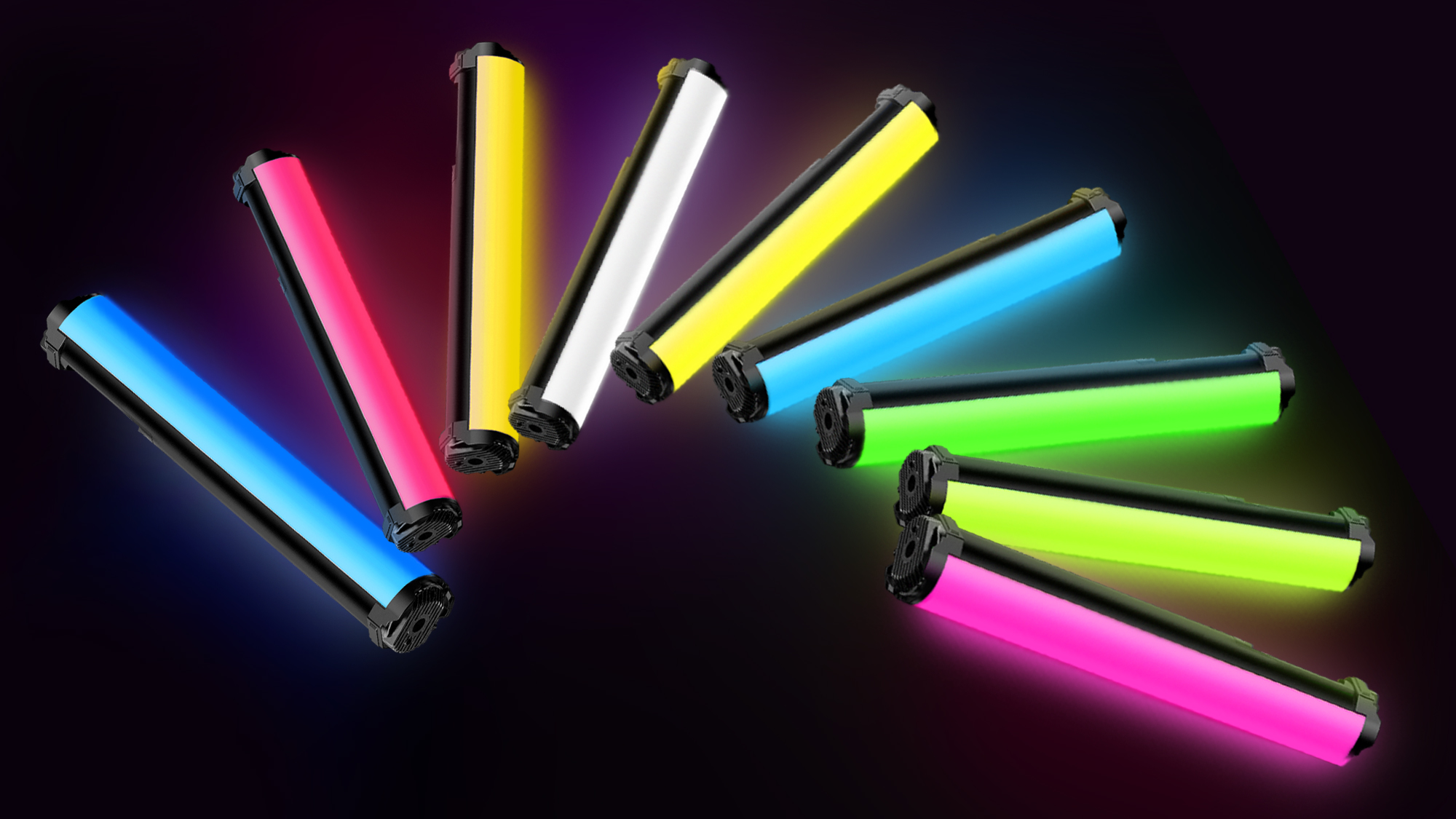
YONGNUO LED video light

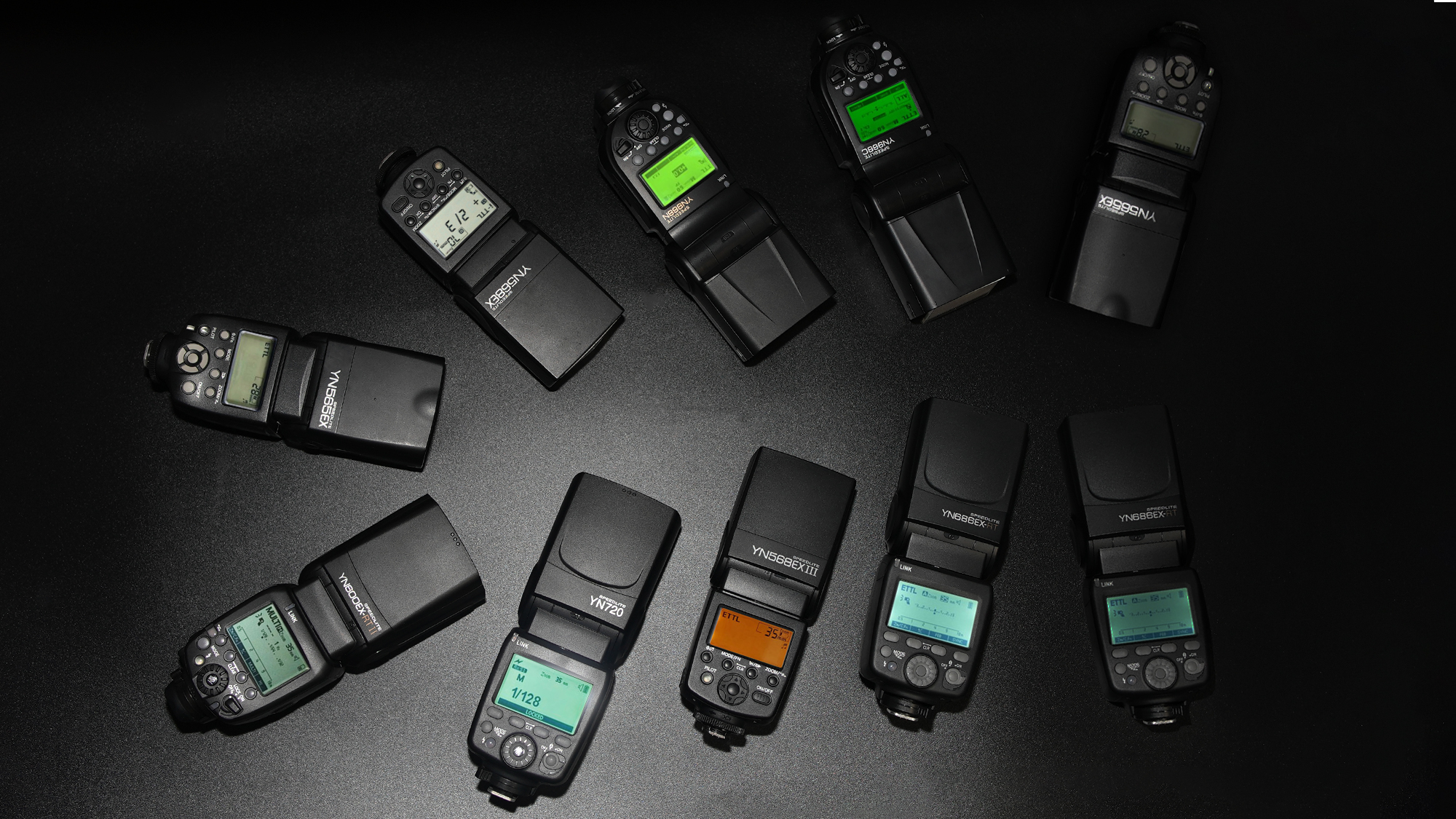
YONGNUO flash speedlite

YONGNUO(永诺) is the International Trademark of photographic equipment manufacturer Shenzhen Yongnuo Photographic Equipment Co. Ltd. of Shenzhen, China which develops and manufactures photographic equipment, including smart camera, lenses, LED video light, flash speedlite, flash trigger, microphone, softbox, and other accessories. Yongnuo makes autofocus prime lenses for DSLR Cameras from Canon and Nikon, for mirrorless cameras from Canon, Sony, and Nikon, and also produces lenses for Olympus and Panasonic.

== Mirrorless cameras ==
As of November 2018, Yongnuo was developing an Android smartphone-based mirrorless interchangeable-lens camera, with 4G connectivity. The YN450 was released only in China in 2019 using the Canon EF lens mount. In 2020, Yongnuo developed a YN450M version using the standard Micro Four Thirds system lens mount, matching the sensor.

In 2021, Yongnuo launched the YN455 version, with a 20-megapixel Four-Thirds sensor, prominent handgrip, and tilt screen.

In 2022, Yongnuo released an upgraded version of YN455, improved the video follow focus speed, and shorten the minimum focusing distance.

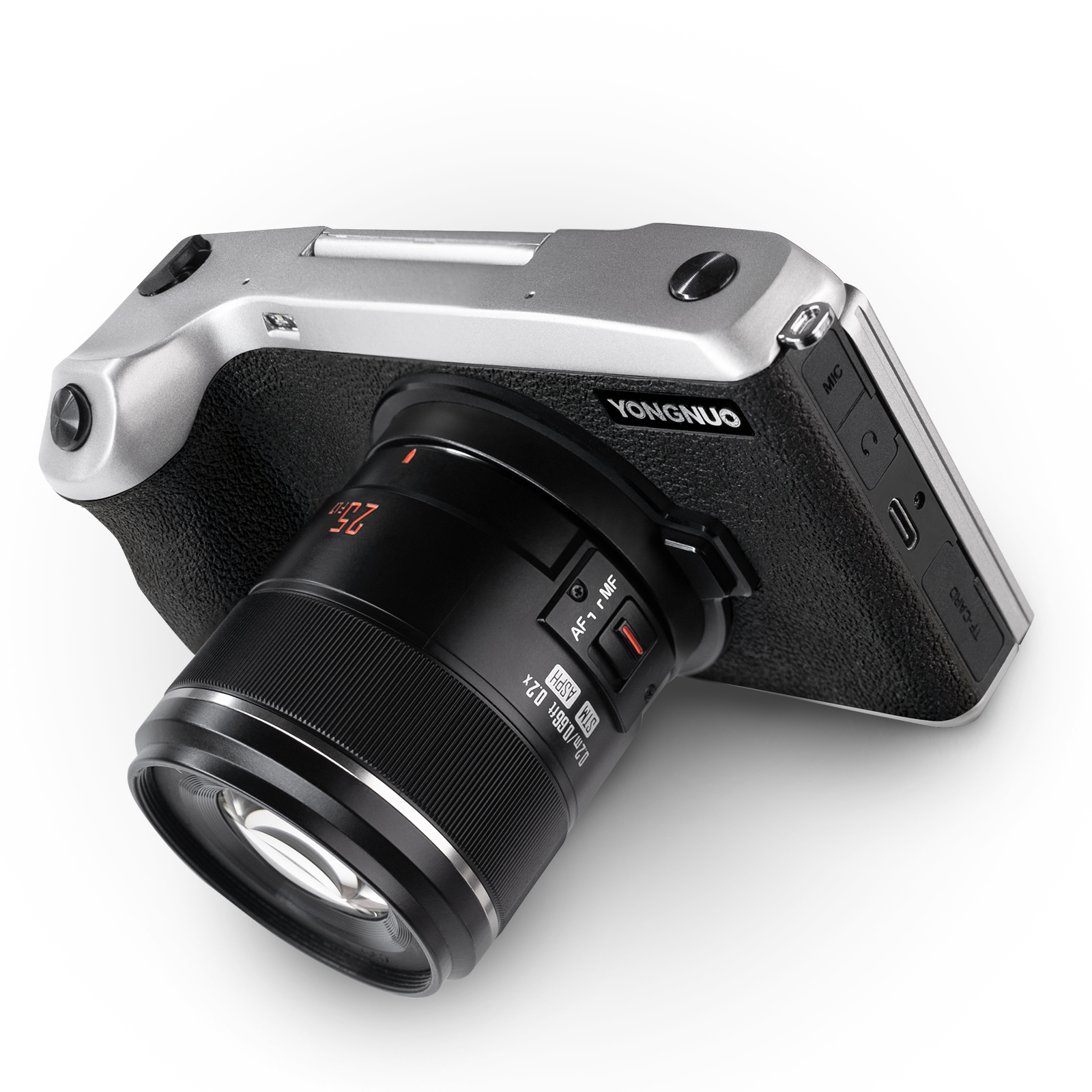
YONGNUO YN455

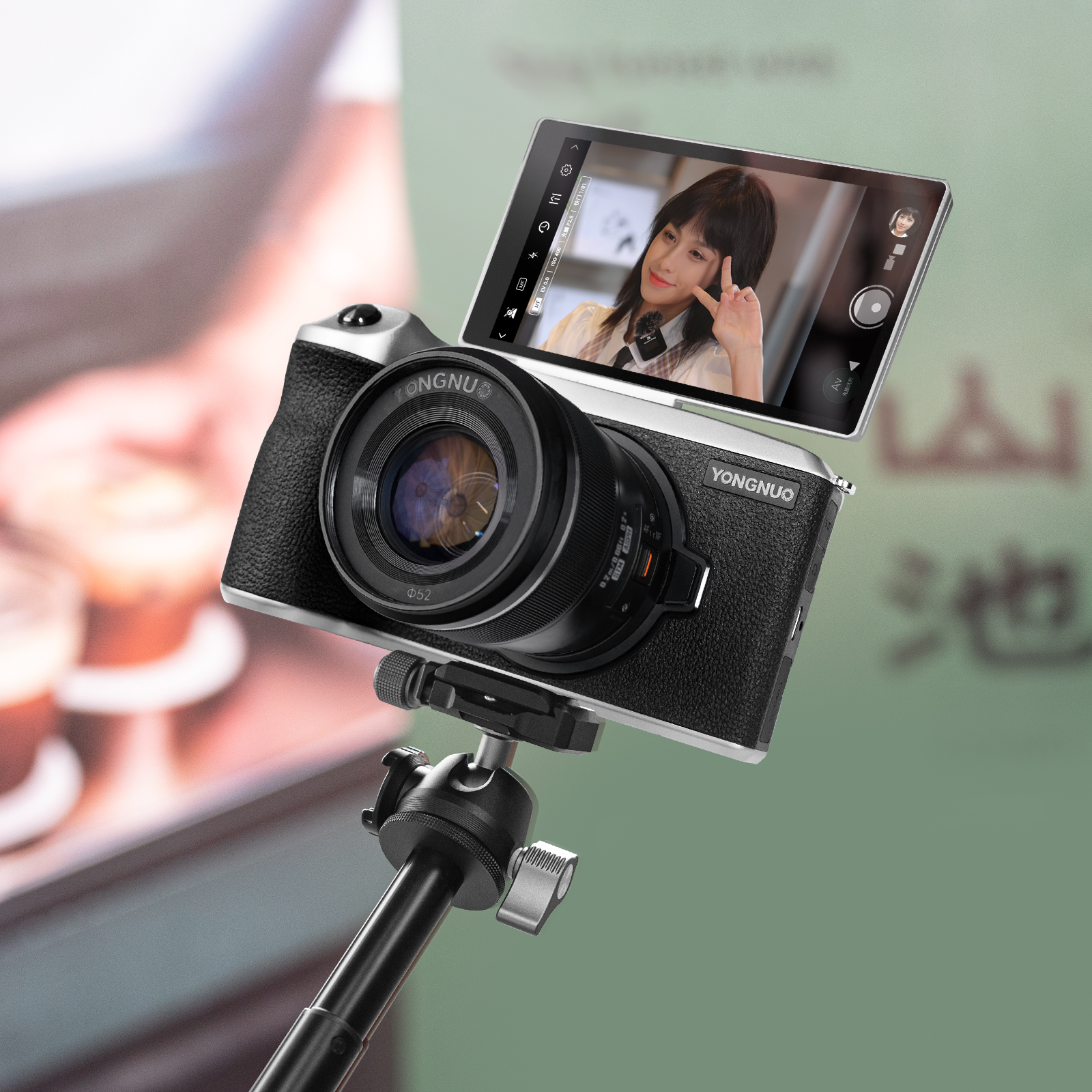
YONGNUO YN455

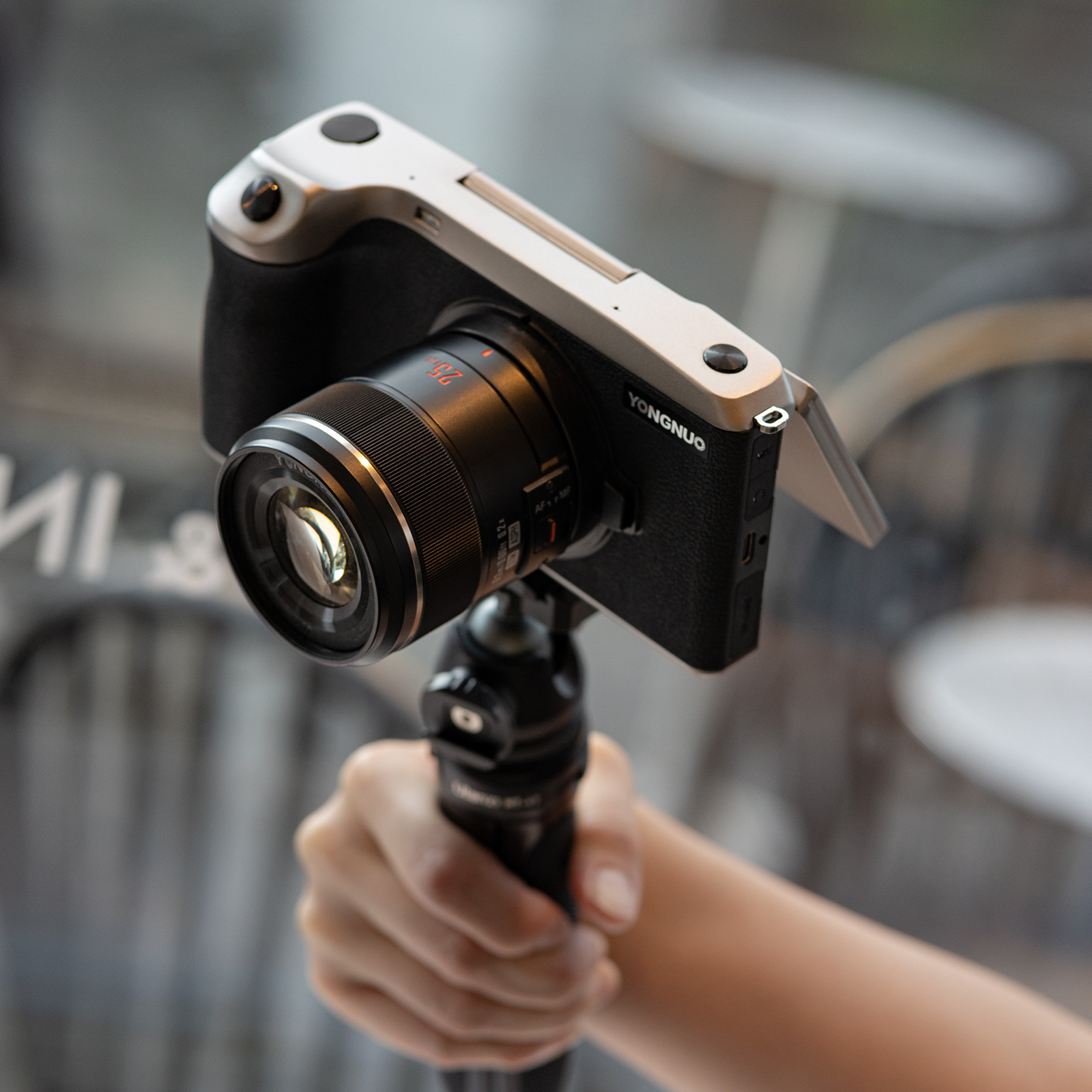
YONGNUO YN455

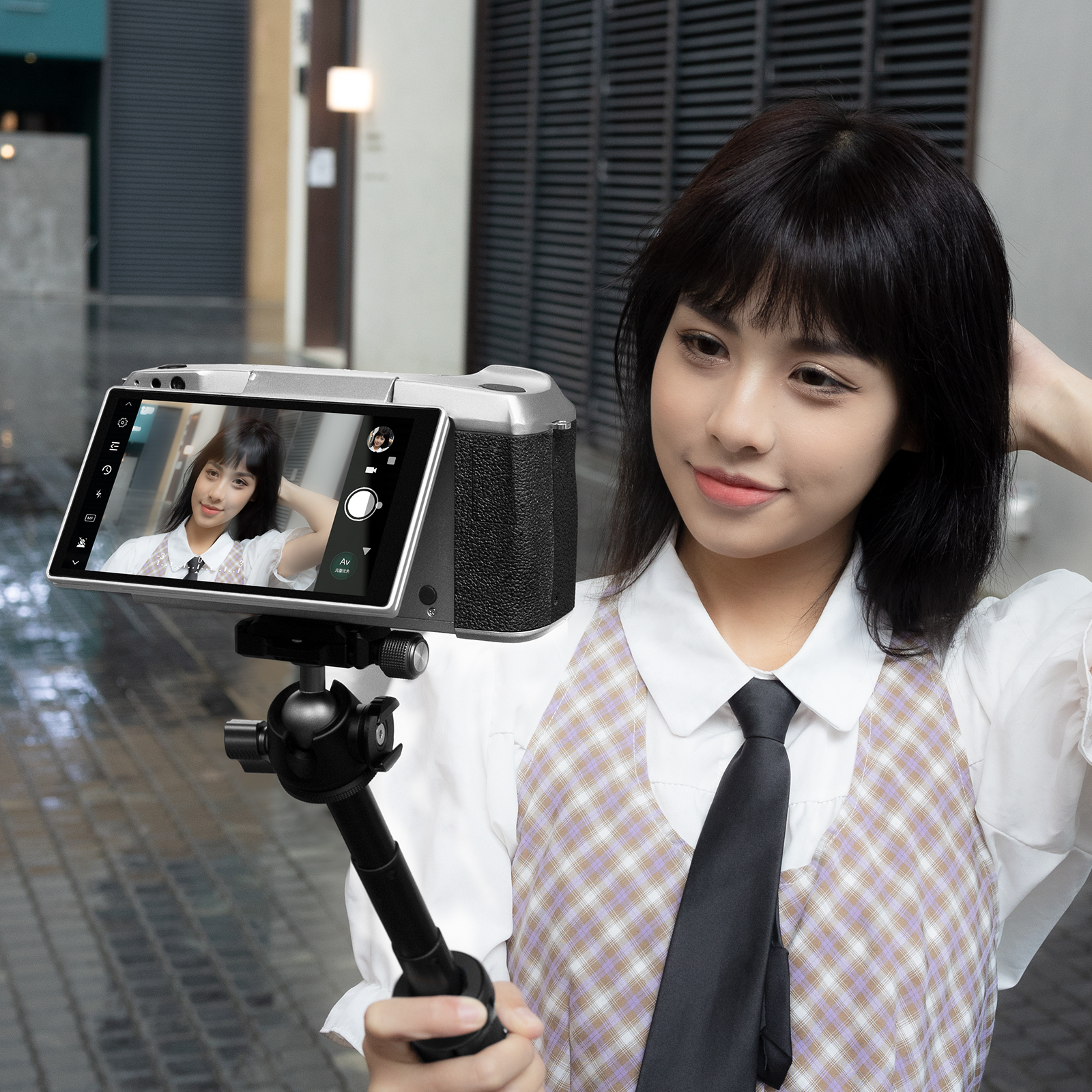
YONGNUO YN455

== Prime lenses ==
Yongnuo lens now cover 6 main mounts: Canon EF, Canon RF, Sony E-mount, Nikon F, Nikon Z, M4/3.

=== For Canon EF ===
- YN14mm F2.8
- YN35mm F1.4
- YN35mm F1.4C DF UWM
- YN35mm F2
- YN40mm F2.8
- YN50mm F1.4
- YN50mm F1.8
- YN50mm F1.8 II
- YN60mm F2 MF
- YN85mm F1.8
- YN100mm F2

=== For Canon RF ===
- YN35mm F2R DF DSM
- YN85mm F1.8R DF DSM

=== For Sony E ===
- YN16mm F1.8S DA DSM (APS-C)
- YN35mm F2S DF DSM
- YN50mm F1.8S DA DSM (APS-C)
- YN50mm F1.8S DF DSM
- YN85mm F1.8S DF DSM
- 85F1.8S DF DSM

=== For Nikon F ===
- YN14mm F2.8N
- YN35mm F2N
- YN40mm F2.8N
- YN50mm 1.4N E
- YN50mm F1.8N
- YN60mm F2NE MF
- YN85mm F1.8N
- YN100mm F2N

=== For Nikon Z ===
- YN35mm F2Z DF DSM
- YN50mm F1.8Z DF DSM
- YN85mm F1.8Z DF DSM

=== For M4/3 ===
- YN17mm F1.7M
- YN25mm F1.7M
- YN42.5mm F1.7M II

== LED video lights ==
Yomgnuo provides professional lights for photographers, studios and companies, which includes panel lights, ring lights, studio lights and ice lights.

=== Studio light ===
- YNLUX100
- LUX160
- YNFLEX180
- YNRAY360
- YNRAY180

=== Ice light ===
- YN100SOFT
- YN60SOFT
- YN30SOFT
- YN660LED
- YN360 III PRO
- YN360 III
- YN360 Mini
- YN360 II
- YN360S
- YN360

=== Vlog light ===
- YN216
- YN300 IV
- YN300Air II
- YN300Air
- YN300 III
- YN60
- YN135
- YN365RGB

=== Interview light ===
- P360 Pro Max
- YN600 Air
- YN9000
- YN6000
- YN1200
- YN900 II
- YN900
- YN600L II
- YN600L

=== Selfie light ===
- YN708
- YN128

== Flash speedlites ==
Yongnuo manufacture a range of flash equipment including versions for macro usage, and with optical or radio remote control, capable of master and slave usage. LED lights for video usage are also manufactured.

Flash for Canon: YN650EX-RF, YN565EX III, YN968EX-RT, YN686EX-RT, YN685 II, YN680EX-RT, YN600EX-RT II, YN568EX III, YN560 IV, YN560 III

Flash for Nikon: YN565EX III, YN568EX III, YN968N II, YN560 IV, YN560 III

Flash for Sony: YN685EX-RF, YN320EX, YN560 IV, YN560 III

Flash for Pentax: YN585EX, YN560 IV, YN560 III

Portable Flash: YN200

Macro Ringlight Flash: YN24EX, YN14EX II, YN14EX

Flash	GN	TTL Shoe	HSS	Battery	Ext. Pwr.	FW up.	RX Protocol	TX Protocol	Optical Slave	Optical Master	Slave TTL
YN-200	60	No	No	1x YN-B2900 Li-ion	No	Yes	603	No	S1/S2/Sc/Sn	No	Yes
YN-460	33	Manual	No	4x AA	No	No	No	No	S1/S2	No	No
YN-460 II	38	Manual	No	4x AA	No	No	No	No	S1/S2	No	No
YN-465	33	C/N	No	4x AA	No	No	No	No	No	No	No
YN-467	33	C/N	No	4x AA	No	No	No	No	S1/S2	No	No
YN-467 II	33	C/N	No	4x AA	No	No	No	No	S1/S2	No	No
YN-468	33	C/N	No	4x AA	No	No	No	No	S1/S2	No	No
YN-468 II	33	C/N	No	4x AA	No	No	No	No	S1/S2	No	No
YN-560	58	Manual	No	4x AA	Yes	No	No	No	S1/S2	No	No
YN-560 II	58	Manual	No	4x AA	Yes	No	No	No	S1/S2	No	No
YN-560 III	58	Manual	No	4x AA	Yes	No	603/602	No	S1/S2	No	No
YN-560 IV	58	Manual	No	4x AA	Yes	No	603/602	603/602	S1/S2	No	No
YN-660	66	Manual	No	4x AA	Yes	No	603/602	603/602	S1/S2	No	No
YN-560Li	58	Manual	No	2x 18650	No	Yes	603/602	603/602	S1/S2	No	No
YN-720	60	Manual	No	1x YN-B2000 Li-ion	No	Yes	603/602	603/602	S1/S2	No	No
YN-730	60	Manual	No	1x LB-E1 Li-ion	No	Yes	603/602	603/602	S1/S2	No	No
YN-860Li	60	Manual	No	1x YN-B1800 Li-ion	No	Yes	603/602	603/602	S1/S2	No	No
YN-510EX	53	Manual	No	4x AA	No	No	No	No	S1/S2/Sc/Sn	No	Yes
YN-560EX	58	Manual	No	4x AA	No	No	No	No	S1/S2/Sc/Sn	No	Yes
YN-500EX	53	C	Yes	4x AA	No	No	No	No	S1/S2/Sc/Sn	No	Yes
YN-565EX	58	N	No	4x AA	Yes	No	No	No	S1/S2/Sc/Sn	No	Yes
YN-565EX II	58	C	No	4x AA	Yes	No	No	No	S1/S2/Sc/Sn	No	Yes
YN-565EX III	58	C/N	No	4x AA	Yes	Yes	No	No	S1/S2/Sc/Sn	No	Yes
YN-568EX	58	N	Yes	4x AA	No	No	No	No	S1/S2/Sc/Sn	No	Yes
YN-568EX II	58	C	Yes	4x AA	No	No	No	No	S1/S2/Sc/Sn	C	Yes
YN-568EX III	58	C/N	Yes	4x AA	No	Yes	No	No	S1/S2/Sc/Sn	C	Yes
YN-585EX	58	P	No	4x AA	No	Yes	No	No	S1/S2/Sp	No	Yes
YN-685	60	C/N	Yes	4x AA	Yes	Yes	622/603	No	No	No	Yes
YN-685 II	60	C	Yes	4x AA	Yes	Yes	622/603	No	No	No	Yes
YN-320EX	31	S	Yes	2x AA	No	Yes	603/602	603	S1/S2/Ss	S	Yes
YN-650EX-RF	60	C	Yes	4x AA	Yes	Yes	603/602	603	S1/S2/Sc	C	Yes
YN-685EX-RF	60	S	Yes	4x AA	Yes	Yes	603/602	603	S1/S2/Ss	No	Yes
YN-862	60	C	Yes	1x YN-B1800 Li-ion	No	Yes	603/602	603/602	S1/S2/Sc	No	Yes
YN-968	60	C/N	Yes	4x AA	Yes	Yes	622/603	622	S1/S2/Sc/Sn	No	Yes
YN-968 II	60	N	Yes	4x AA	Yes	Yes	622/603	622	S1/S2/Sc/Sn	No	Yes
YN-600EX-RT	60	C	Yes	4x AA	Yes	Yes	E3	E3	S1/S2/Sc/Sn	No	Yes
YN-600EX-RT II	60	C	Yes	4x AA	Yes	Yes	E3	E3	S1/S2/Sc/Sn	C	Yes
YN-680EX-RT	60	C	Yes	1x YN-B2000 Li-ion	No	Yes	E3	E3	S1/S2/Sc/Sn	C	Yes
YN-686EX-RT	60	C	Yes	1x YN-BH2000 Li-ion	No	Yes	E3	E3	S1/S2/Sc/Sn	C	Yes
YN-690EX-RT	60	C	Yes	1x LB-E1 Li-ion	No	Yes	E3	E3	S1/S2/Sc/Sn	C	Yes
YN-968EX-RT	60	C	Yes	4x AA	Yes	Yes	E3	E3	S1/S2/Sc/Sn	No	Yes

* On some models, the 603 protocol is also known as the 560 mode (See § Flash Trigger), but does not support the 602 protocol actually.

Legend:
C - Canon
N - Nikon
P - Pentax
S - Sony
Sc - Canon proprietary optical slave protocol
Sn - Nikon proprietary optical slave protocol
Sp - Pentax proprietary optical slave protocol
Ss - Sony proprietary optical slave protocol

== Flash triggers ==
Yongnuo has made various triggers over the years with various protocols. It Yongnuo's wireless ecosystem comprises 4 protocols, namely the 602, 603, 622 and E3 protocols. Early triggers such as the 600, 601, 602 and 603 transmit the fire signal only, while later triggers used the improved 603 protocol, essentially known as the 560 mode, to implement the ability to transmit Flash mode, TTL, HSS, Group, ID and Power data. The 622 protocol was created as a stopgap to implement the transmission of TTL, HSS, Group and Power data, but was not backwards compatible the 603 protocol and thus making the product line segregated. The 622 protocol ultimately failed to gain traction, as most of the flashes integrates the 603 protocol, including the YN200. Yongnuo realized that to compete with Godox's Wireless X system, it needed to enhance the 603 protocol. This led to the creation of a unified ecosystem with the introduction of the YN560-TX Pro, which uses the improved 603 protocol (560 mode). The E3 protocol is used exclusively to integrate with Canon's proprietary wireless radio protocol only.

- RF603 II For Canon/Nikon
- YN560-TX II For Canon/Nikon/Sony
- YN560-TX PRO For Canon/Nikon/Sony
- YN622 II For Canon/Nikon
- YN32-TX For Sony
- YN-E3-RT II For Canon

Trigger	TTL System	TX Protocol	RX Protocol	TTL	HSS	Group	Power	ID	FW up.	Battery
RF-600TX	No	602	No	No	No	No	No	No	No	1x CR2
RF-601TX	No	602	No	No	No	No	No	No	No	1x CR2
RF-601RX	No	No	602	No	No	No	No	No	No	2x AAA
RF-602TX	No	602	No	No	No	No	No	No	No	1x CR2
RF-602RX	No	No	602	No	No	No	No	No	No	2x AAA
RF-603	No	603	603	No	No	No	No	No	No	2x AAA
RF-603 II	No	603	603	No	No	No	No	No	No	2x AAA
RF605	No	603/602	603/602	No	No	Yes	No	No	No	2x AAA
YN622-TX	C/N	622	No	Yes	Yes	Yes	Yes	No	Yes	2x AA
YN622	C/N	622	622	Yes	Yes	Yes	Yes	No	No	2x AA
YN622 II	C/N	622	622/603	Yes	Yes	Yes	Yes	No	Yes	2x AA
YN560-TX	No	603/602	No	No	No	Yes	Yes	No	No	2x AA
YN560-TX II	No	603/602	No	No	No	Yes	Yes	No	No	2x AA
YN560-TX Pro	C/N/S	603/602	No	Yes	Yes	Yes	Yes	Yes	Yes	2x AA
YN32-TX	S	603/602	No	Yes	Yes	Yes	Yes	Yes	Yes	Built-in Li-ion
YNE3-RX	C	No	E3	Yes	No	Yes	Yes	Yes	Yes	2x AA
YN-E3-RT	C	E3	No	Yes	Yes	Yes	Yes	Yes	Yes	2x AA
YN-E3-RT II	C	E3	No	Yes	Yes	Yes	Yes	Yes	Yes	2x AA
