= Fujifilm X-Pro3 =

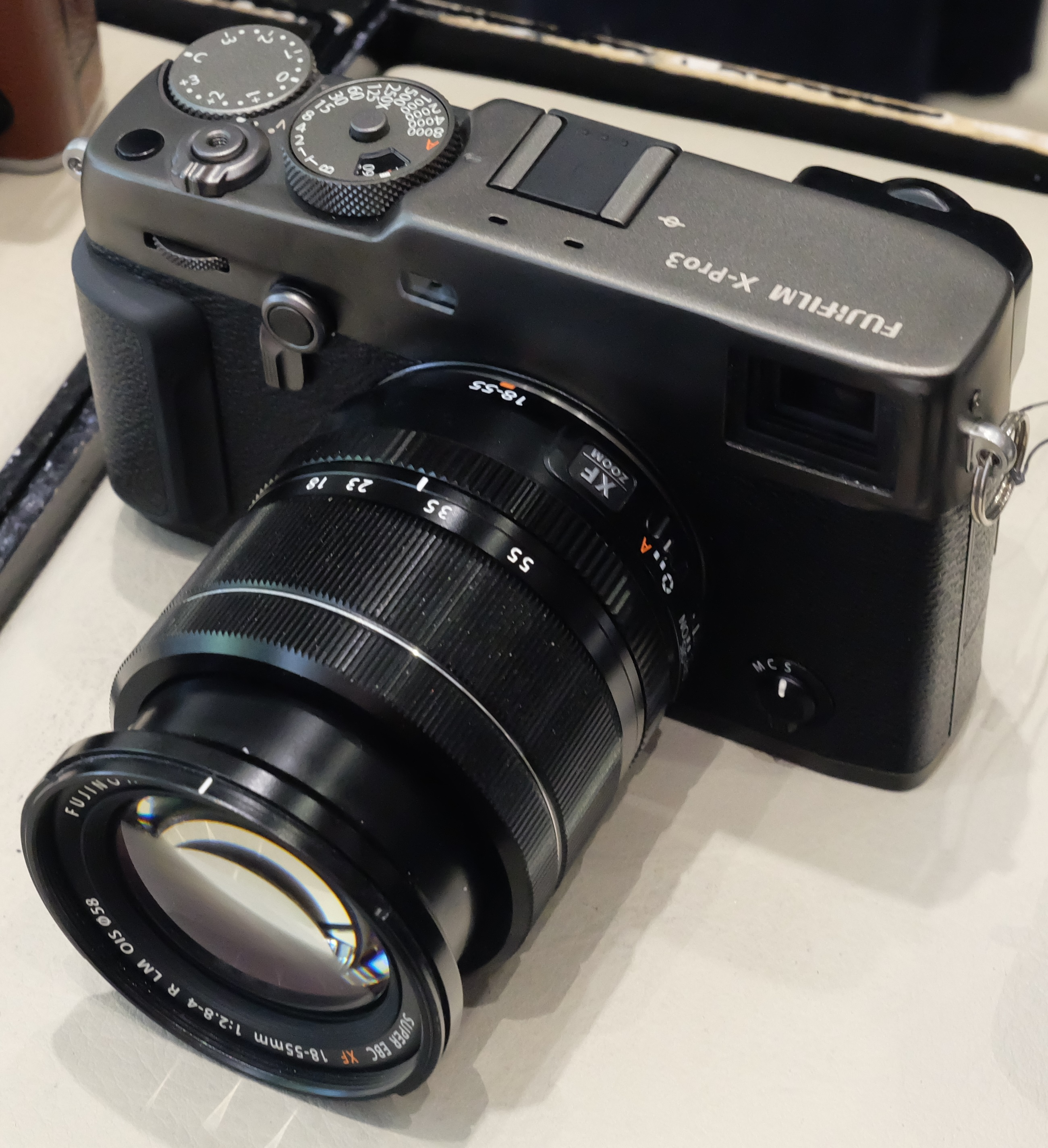
- X-Pro3 +XF18mm-55mm F2.8-4 R LM OIS

Overview
- Maker: Fujifilm
- Type: Mirrorless camera
- Released: October 23, 2019
- Intro price: USD 1,799 (body)

Lens
- Lens mount: Fujifilm X
- Lens: Interchangeable lens

Sensor/medium
- Sensor type: X-Trans CMOS 4
- Sensor size: 23.5 mm x 15.6 mm (APS-C)
- Sensor maker: Sony
- Maximum resolution: 6240 x 4160 (26.1 megapixels)
- Film speed: 160–12800 (standard); 80–51200 (extend)
- Recording medium: SD, SDHC, SDXC; V30, UHS-II, UHS-I
- Storage media: SD card

Focusing
- Focus: Intelligent Hybrid TTL contrast detection / Phase detection
- Focus modes: Single point, Zone, Wide/Tracking
- Focus areas: 91 focus point
- Focus bracketing: Auto, Manual

Exposure/metering
- Exposure: TTL 256-zones metering
- Exposure modes: Program, Aperture Priority, Shutter Speed Priority, Manual Exposure
- Metering modes: Multi, Spot, Average

Flash
- Flash: External Flash
- Flash synchronization: 1/250 s
- Flash bracketing: ±1/3EV, ±2/3EV, ±1EV
- Compatible flashes: Dedicated TTL Flash compatible

Shutter
- Shutter: Focal Plane Shutter
- Shutter speeds: 4 s to 1/8000 s (mechanical), 4 s to 1/32000 s (electronic)
- Continuous shooting: 30 frames per second

Viewfinder
- Viewfinder: 0.5 in 3.69M dots OLED, Hybrid OVF and EVF
- Viewfinder magnification: 0.66
- Frame coverage: 100%

Image processing
- Image processor: X-Processor 4
- White balance: Auto, Custom, Preset, Fluorescent, Incandescent, Underwater
- WB bracketing: ±1, ±2, ±3
- Dynamic range bracketing: 100%, 200%, 400%

General
- Video recording: MP4 / MOV; DCI 4K up to 30 fps, 4K up to 30 fps, 1080p up to 120 fps
- LCD screen: 3.0 in 1.62M dots Hidden-tilt touchscreen
- Battery: NP-W126S Li-ion
- AV port: 2.5 mm audio jack
- Data port(s): USB-C 3.1, Wi-Fi 4, Bluetooth 4.2
- Body features: Ultra Sonic Vibration Sensor Cleaning system
- Dimensions: 140.5 mm × 82.8 mm × 46.1 mm (5.53 in × 3.26 in × 1.81 in)
- Weight: 497 g (18 oz) (1.096 lb) without battery and memory card
- Made in: Japan

Chronology
- Predecessor: Fujifilm X-Pro2

The Fujifilm X-Pro3 is a mirrorless interchangeable-lens digital camera announced on October 23, 2019. It is part of Fujifilm's X-Series of cameras, the successor to the X-Pro2. Sales began on November 28, 2019.

X-Pro3 is the latest release of the series.

== Features ==
The overall design follows traditional range finder cameras much like the X-Pro 1 and X-Pro 2 before it but like those cameras it is a traditional mirrorless camera but with the addition of an Optical View Finder to complement the Electric View Finder.

A lever on the front of the camera switches between EVF and OVF with the OVF providing clear framelines and the view outside of these framelines in a rangefinder style, leading to the X-Pro series being popular with street photographers to see what might be entering their shot.

The camera's top and base plates are made from titanium, and the rest of the body shell is made from magnesium alloy. A variant with a harder wearing DuraTect finish for the titanium top and base plates is scheduled to be available from 8 December 2019. Reviewers have indicated the latter finish accentuates fingerprints.

Another notable design change from previous X-Pro models is the X-Pro3's hidden display. The camera's main LCD screen is mounted on an inward facing hinge and must be opened downwards for viewing or waist level shooting, leaving the screen hidden and the rear of the camera protected when not in use. On the back side of the LCD screen (viewable when the LCD is not) is a secondary unlit display which can be used to display the camera's settings or the film simulation in use.

The X-Pro3 does not have in-body image stabilization. The autofocus works down to -6 EV (near darkness). The camera has the pre-shot ES feature.

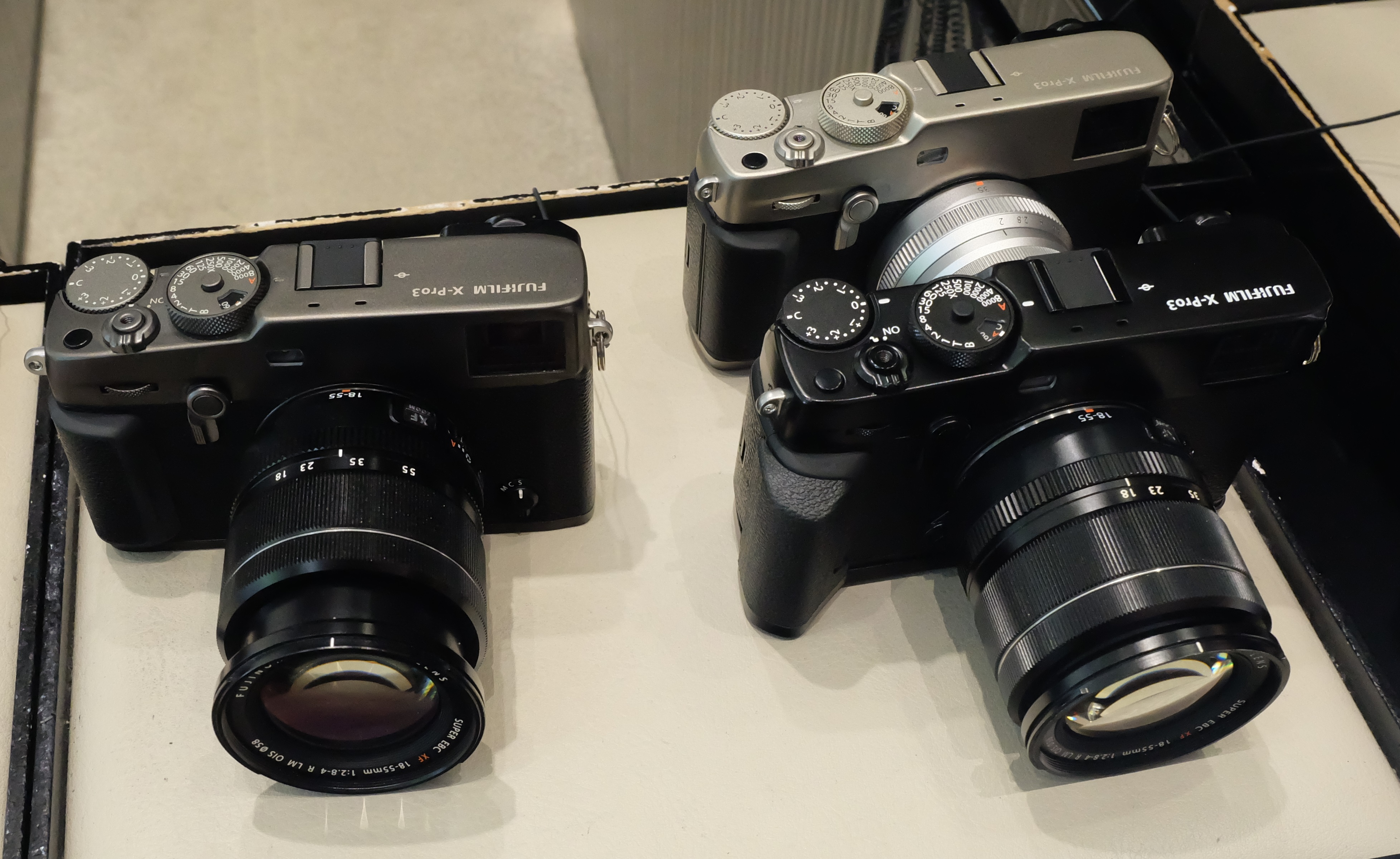

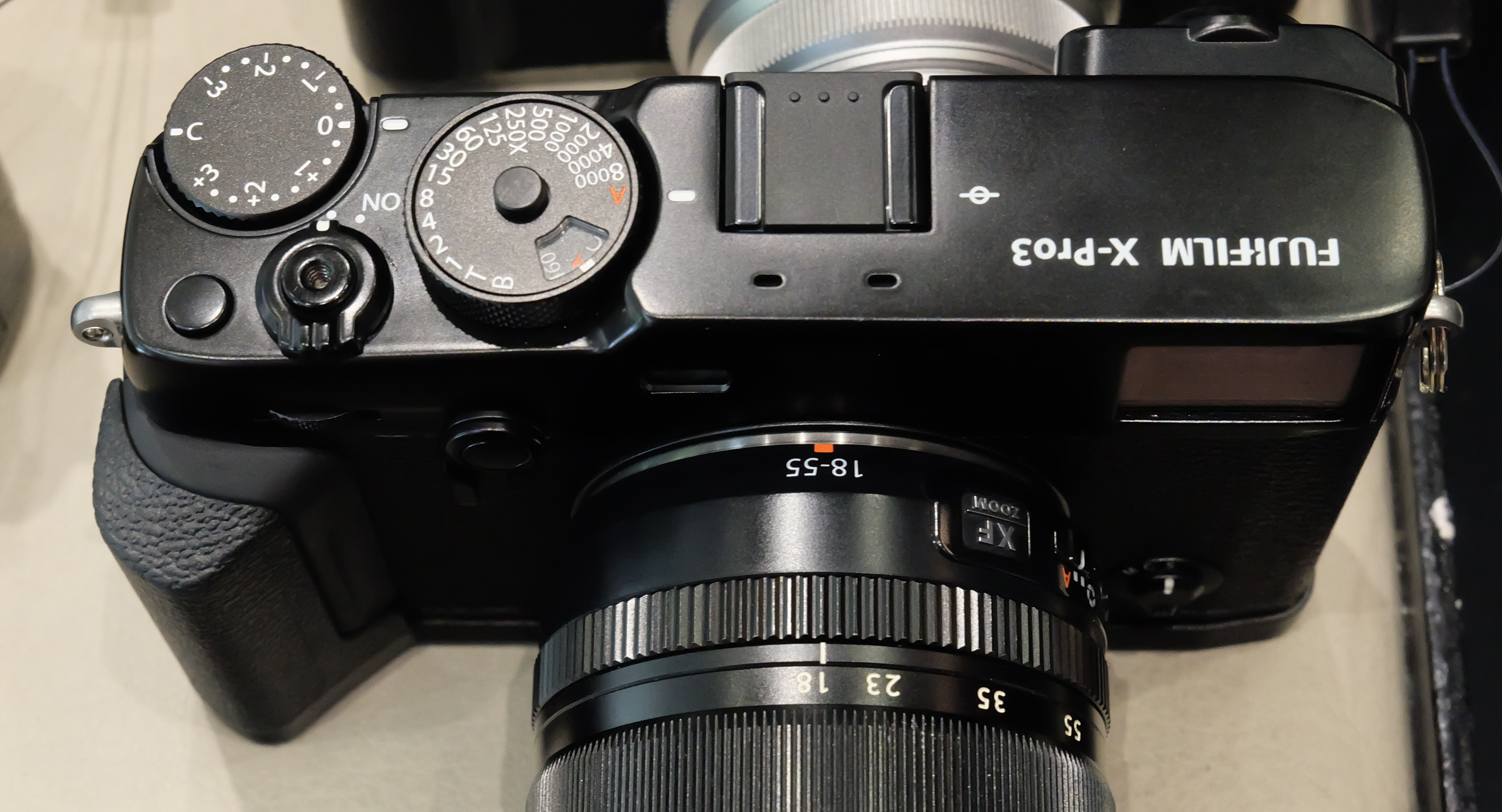

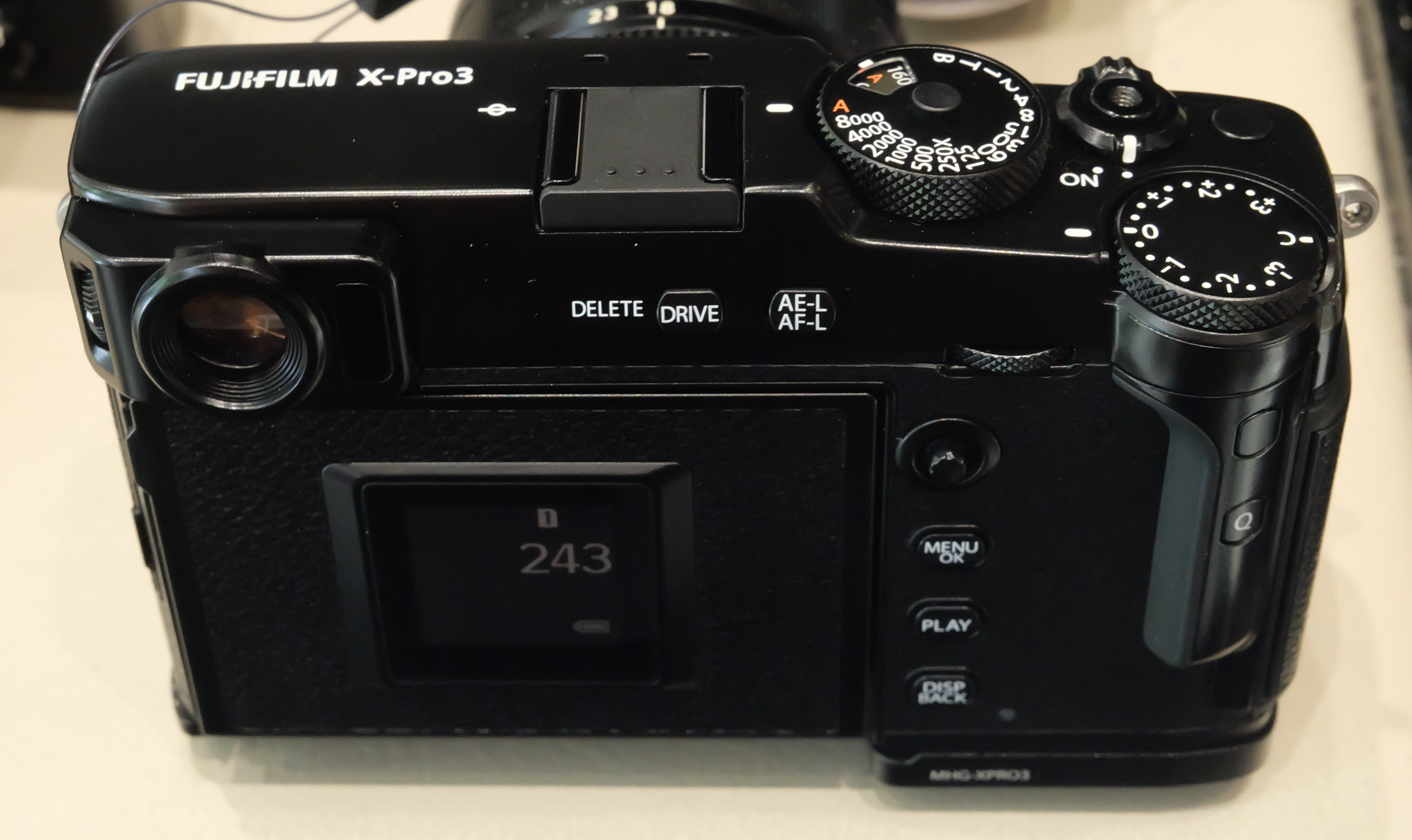

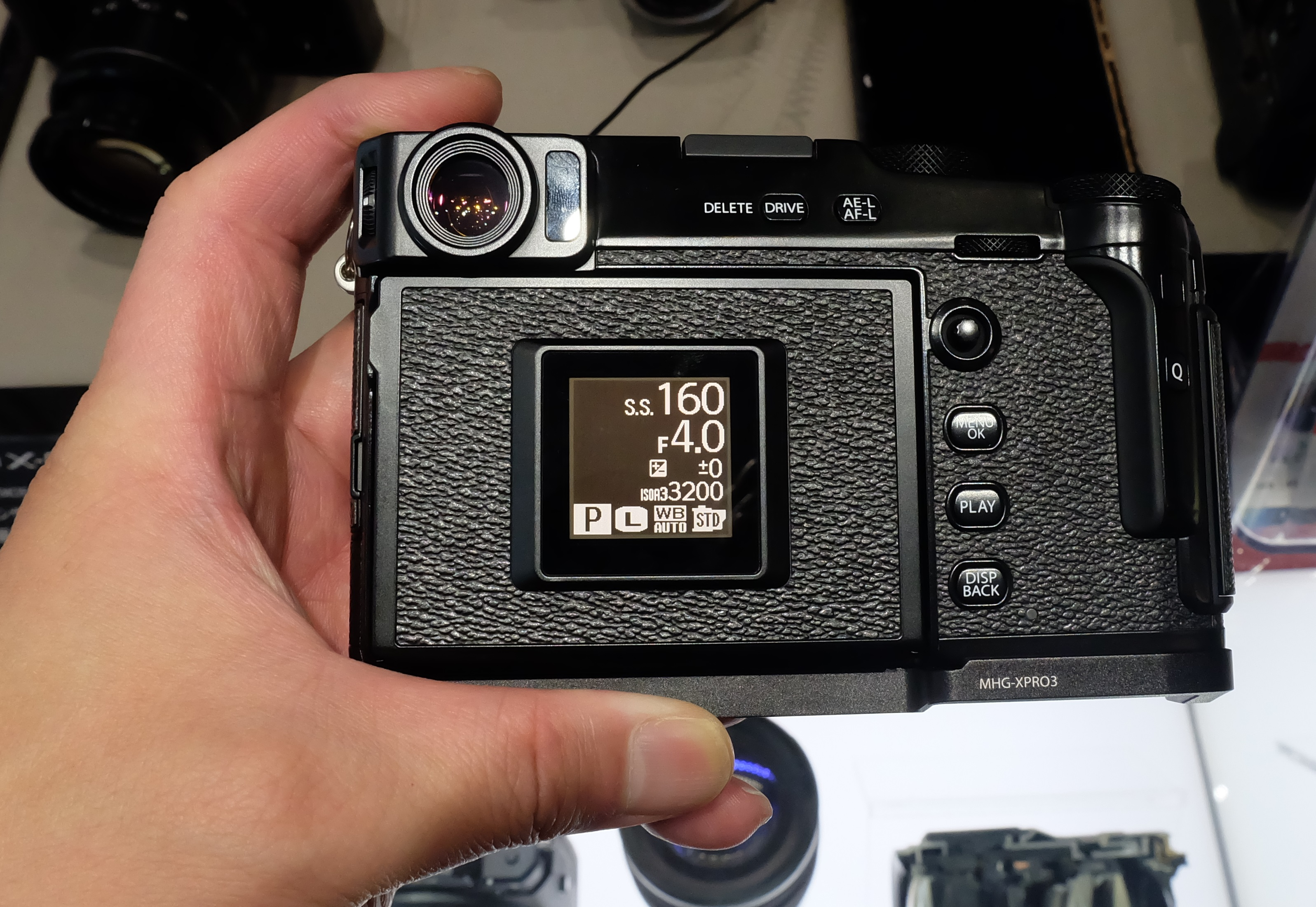

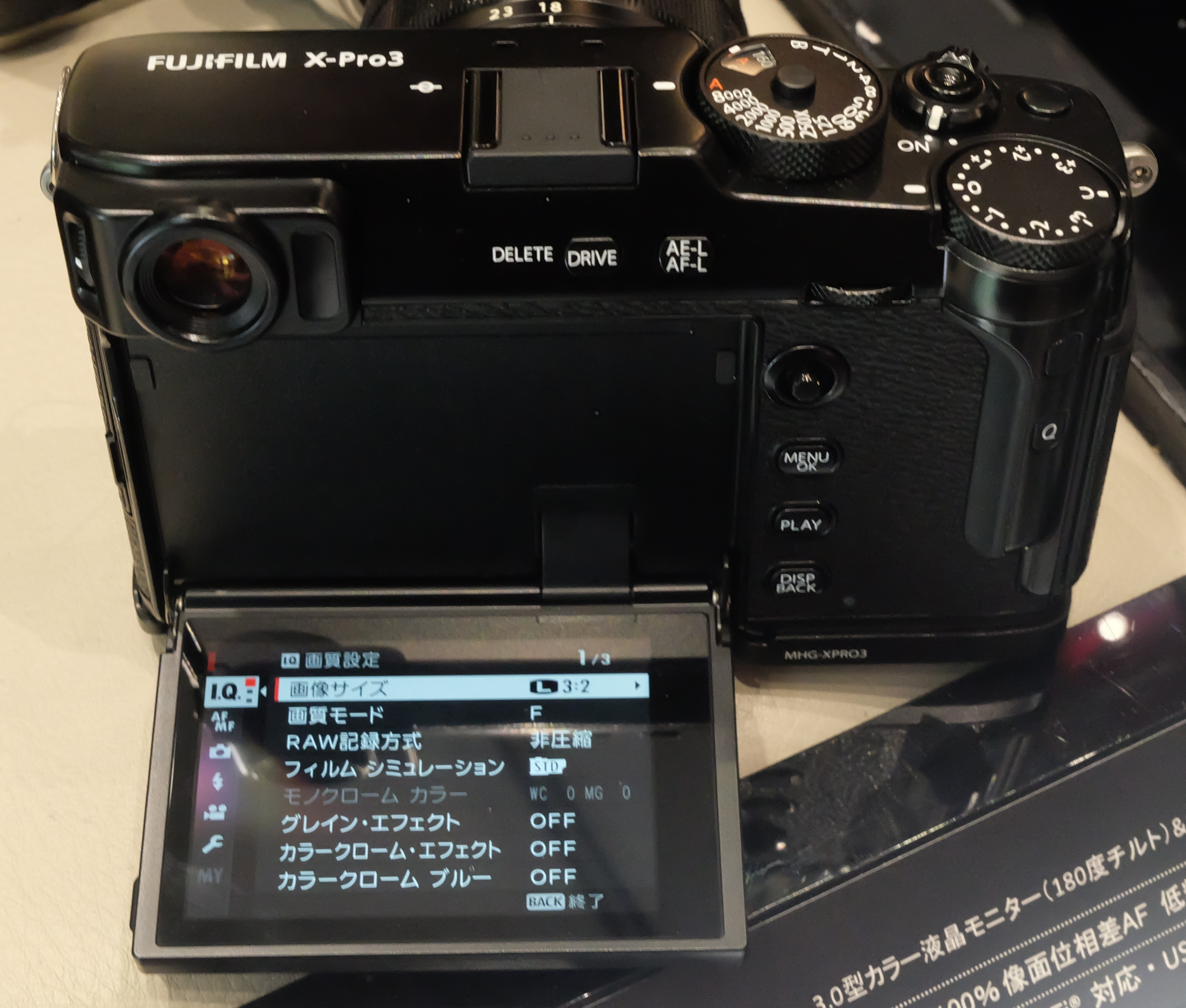

== See also ==
- List of retro-style digital cameras

Type	Lens	2011	2012	2013	2014	2015	2016	2017	2018	2019	2020	2021	2022	2023	2024	2025	2026
MILC	G-mount; Medium format sensor							GFX 50S ^{F} ^{T}					GFX 50S II ^{F} ^{T}				
MILC	G-mount; Medium format sensor									GFX 50R ^{F} ^{T}							
MILC	G-mount; Medium format sensor										GFX 100 ^{F} ^{T}					GFX 100 II ^{F} ^{T}	
MILC	G-mount; Medium format sensor											GFX 100 IR ^{F} ^{T}					
MILC	G-mount; Medium format sensor											GFX 100S ^{F} ^{T}				GFX 100S II ^{F} ^{T}	
MILC	G-mount; Medium format sensor															GFX Eterna 55 ^{F} ^{T}	
MILC	Prime lens Medium format sensor															GFX 100RF ^{F} ^{T}	
MILC	X-mount; APS-C sensor		X-Pro1				X-Pro2				X-Pro3 ^{f} ^{T}						
MILC	X-mount; APS-C sensor								X-H1 ^{F} ^{T}					X-H2 ^{A} ^{T}			
MILC	X-mount; APS-C sensor													X-H2S ^{A} ^{T}			
MILC	X-mount; APS-C sensor											X-S10 ^{A} ^{T}			X-S20 ^{A} ^{T}		
MILC	X-mount; APS-C sensor				X-T1 ^{f}			X-T2 ^{F}		X-T3 ^{F} ^{T}		X-T4 ^{A} ^{T}		X-T5 ^{F} ^{T}			
MILC	X-mount; APS-C sensor															X-T50 ^{f} ^{T}	
MILC	X-mount; APS-C sensor						X-T10 ^{f}	X-T20 ^{f} ^{T}		X-T30 ^{f} ^{T}			X-T30 II ^{f} ^{T}			X-T30 III ^{f} ^{T}	
MILC	X-mount; APS-C sensor									_{15} X-T100 ^{F} ^{T}	X-T200 ^{A} ^{T}						
MILC	X-mount; APS-C sensor			X-E1	X-E2		X-E2s		X-E3 ^{T}			X-E4 ^{f} ^{T}				X-E5 ^{f} ^{T}	
MILC	X-mount; APS-C sensor				X-M1 ^{f}											X-M5 ^{A} ^{T}	
MILC	X-mount; APS-C sensor				X-A1 ^{f}	X-A2 ^{f}		X-A3 ^{f} ^{T}	_{15} X-A5 ^{f} ^{T}		X-A7 ^{A} ^{T}						
MILC	X-mount; APS-C sensor							X-A10 ^{f}	X-A20 ^{f} ^{T}								
Compact	Prime lens APS-C sensor	X100		X100S		X100T		X100F			X100V ^{f} ^{T}				X100VI ^{f} ^{T}		
Compact	Prime lens APS-C sensor						X70 ^{f} ^{T}			XF10 ^{T}							
Compact	Prime lens 1" sensor															X half ^{T}	
Compact	Zoom lens^{2}/_{3}" sensor		X10	X20		X30 ^{f}											
Compact	Zoom lens^{2}/_{3}" sensor				XQ1	XQ2											
Compact	Zoom lens^{2}/_{3}" sensor			XF1													
Bridge	^{2}/_{3}" sensor		X-S1 ^{f}														
Type	Lens																
Type	Lens	2011	2012	2013	2014	2015	2016	2017	2018	2019	2020	2021	2022	2023	2024	2025	2026
