= Fujifilm X-Pro1 =

2012 APS-C mirrorless camera

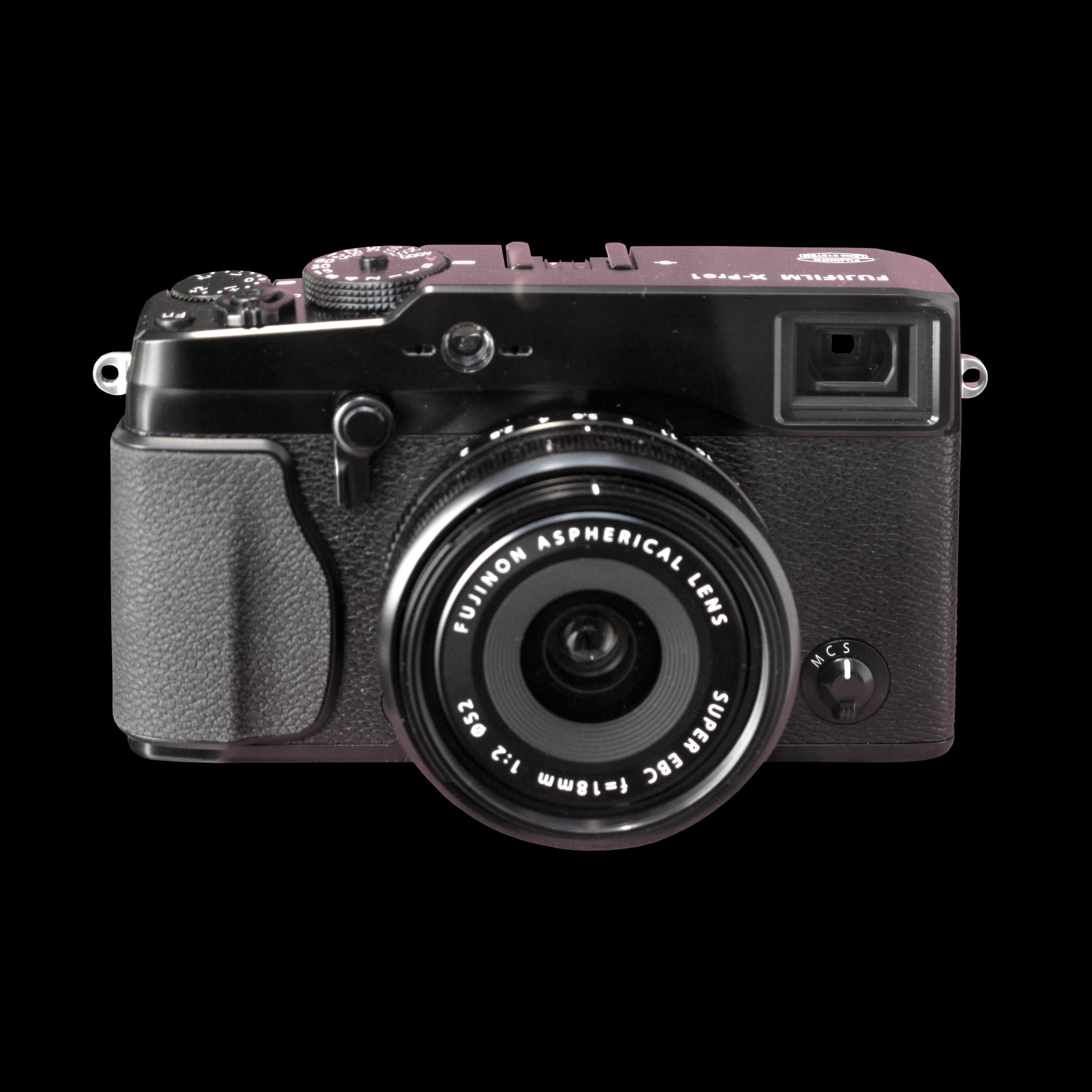
- Fujifilm X-Pro1

Overview
- Maker: Fujifilm
- Type: Mirrorless interchangeable lens camera

Lens
- Lens mount: Fujifilm X-mount

Sensor/medium
- Sensor type: "X-Trans" CMOS
- Sensor size: 23.6mm × 15.6mm (APS-C)
- Maximum resolution: 16.3 megapixels
- Recording medium: SD, SDHC, SDXC

Focusing
- Focus: contrast detection

Exposure/metering
- Exposure: TTL 256-zones metering

Viewfinder
- Viewfinder: Hybrid (OVF and EVF)
- Image processor: EXR Pro

General
- Dimensions: 139.5 (W) × 81.8 (H) × 42.5 (D) mm
- Weight: 450 g (16 oz) (0.99 lb) (including battery and memory card)
- Made in: Japan

Chronology
- Successor: Fujifilm X-Pro2

The Fujifilm X-Pro1 is a mirrorless interchangeable-lens digital camera announced in January 2012 and launched in March 2012. It is part of Fujifilm's X-Series of cameras. In October 2012 Fujifilm released a very similar, yet smaller, camera named the X-E1. In January 2016 Fujifilm announced its successor, the X-Pro2.

== Key features ==
- 16-megapixel, APS-C sized "X-Trans" CMOS sensor
- Compatible with the Fujifilm X-mount system of lenses
- 2nd generation Hybrid Viewfinder
- TTL Hot shoe and Sync Terminal

== Fujifilm "X-Trans" CMOS sensor ==
The repeating 6 × 6 grid used in the x-trans sensor

The Fujifilm X-Trans CMOS sensor used in the X-Pro1 (and other Fuji X-series cameras) is claimed to provide higher resolution than full-frame sensors, and also produce better colour reproduction.

Anti-aliasing filters are used on standard Bayer Array Sensors to reduce moiré effect when shooting regular patterns - however they are known to slightly reduce resolution. The "X-Trans" CMOS sensor uses a different pattern of pixels in order to reduce moiré without the need for an AA filter.

This same pattern ensures that all horizontal and vertical lines of pixels contain R, G and B pixels whereas Bayer array sensors do not have R and B in some lines.

== Hybrid viewfinder ==
Fujifilm's Hybrid Viewfinder allows photographers to choose between an optical finder (OVF) and a high-resolution electronic view (EVF), complete with previews of depth of field and white balance. It also allows different optical magnifications and frame sizes to allow accurate framing with any of the XF-mount lenses in the system.

When an XF lens is mounted on the camera body, the most appropriate of the two available viewfinder magnifications is combined with the correct frame size.

== Reviews ==
A number of reviews by popular photography websites have been very positive - with some noticeable negatives identified with the camera. The camera's high ISO performance is often cited as a strength, while reviews initially called out poor auto focus performance in low light and battery life as two of the main weaknesses. Since its release, several firmware upgrades have been released that have significantly improved autofocus speed.

== Firmware updates ==
Fuji has adopted a "Kaizen" approach, meaning continual updates and innovation in releasing firmware updates to the X-Pro1. Since the launch of the camera, there have been 21 firmware updates to fix bugs, improve the camera's performance and add new features. Key areas improved include the camera's autofocus accuracy and speed, as well as new features such as focus peaking in the 3.0 firmware update.

== See also ==
- List of retro-style digital cameras

Type	Lens	2011	2012	2013	2014	2015	2016	2017	2018	2019	2020	2021	2022	2023	2024	2025	2026
MILC	G-mount; Medium format sensor							GFX 50S ^{F} ^{T}					GFX 50S II ^{F} ^{T}				
MILC	G-mount; Medium format sensor									GFX 50R ^{F} ^{T}							
MILC	G-mount; Medium format sensor										GFX 100 ^{F} ^{T}					GFX 100 II ^{F} ^{T}	
MILC	G-mount; Medium format sensor											GFX 100 IR ^{F} ^{T}					
MILC	G-mount; Medium format sensor											GFX 100S ^{F} ^{T}				GFX 100S II ^{F} ^{T}	
MILC	G-mount; Medium format sensor															GFX Eterna 55 ^{F} ^{T}	
MILC	Prime lens Medium format sensor															GFX 100RF ^{F} ^{T}	
MILC	X-mount; APS-C sensor		X-Pro1				X-Pro2				X-Pro3 ^{f} ^{T}						
MILC	X-mount; APS-C sensor								X-H1 ^{F} ^{T}					X-H2 ^{A} ^{T}			
MILC	X-mount; APS-C sensor													X-H2S ^{A} ^{T}			
MILC	X-mount; APS-C sensor											X-S10 ^{A} ^{T}			X-S20 ^{A} ^{T}		
MILC	X-mount; APS-C sensor				X-T1 ^{f}			X-T2 ^{F}		X-T3 ^{F} ^{T}		X-T4 ^{A} ^{T}		X-T5 ^{F} ^{T}			
MILC	X-mount; APS-C sensor															X-T50 ^{f} ^{T}	
MILC	X-mount; APS-C sensor						X-T10 ^{f}	X-T20 ^{f} ^{T}		X-T30 ^{f} ^{T}			X-T30 II ^{f} ^{T}			X-T30 III ^{f} ^{T}	
MILC	X-mount; APS-C sensor									_{15} X-T100 ^{F} ^{T}	X-T200 ^{A} ^{T}						
MILC	X-mount; APS-C sensor			X-E1	X-E2		X-E2s		X-E3 ^{T}			X-E4 ^{f} ^{T}				X-E5 ^{f} ^{T}	
MILC	X-mount; APS-C sensor				X-M1 ^{f}											X-M5 ^{A} ^{T}	
MILC	X-mount; APS-C sensor				X-A1 ^{f}	X-A2 ^{f}		X-A3 ^{f} ^{T}	_{15} X-A5 ^{f} ^{T}		X-A7 ^{A} ^{T}						
MILC	X-mount; APS-C sensor							X-A10 ^{f}	X-A20 ^{f} ^{T}								
Compact	Prime lens APS-C sensor	X100		X100S		X100T		X100F			X100V ^{f} ^{T}				X100VI ^{f} ^{T}		
Compact	Prime lens APS-C sensor						X70 ^{f} ^{T}			XF10 ^{T}							
Compact	Prime lens 1" sensor															X half ^{T}	
Compact	Zoom lens^{2}/_{3}" sensor		X10	X20		X30 ^{f}											
Compact	Zoom lens^{2}/_{3}" sensor				XQ1	XQ2											
Compact	Zoom lens^{2}/_{3}" sensor			XF1													
Bridge	^{2}/_{3}" sensor		X-S1 ^{f}														
Type	Lens																
Type	Lens	2011	2012	2013	2014	2015	2016	2017	2018	2019	2020	2021	2022	2023	2024	2025	2026
