= Fujifilm X-Pro2 =

2016 APS-C mirrorless camera

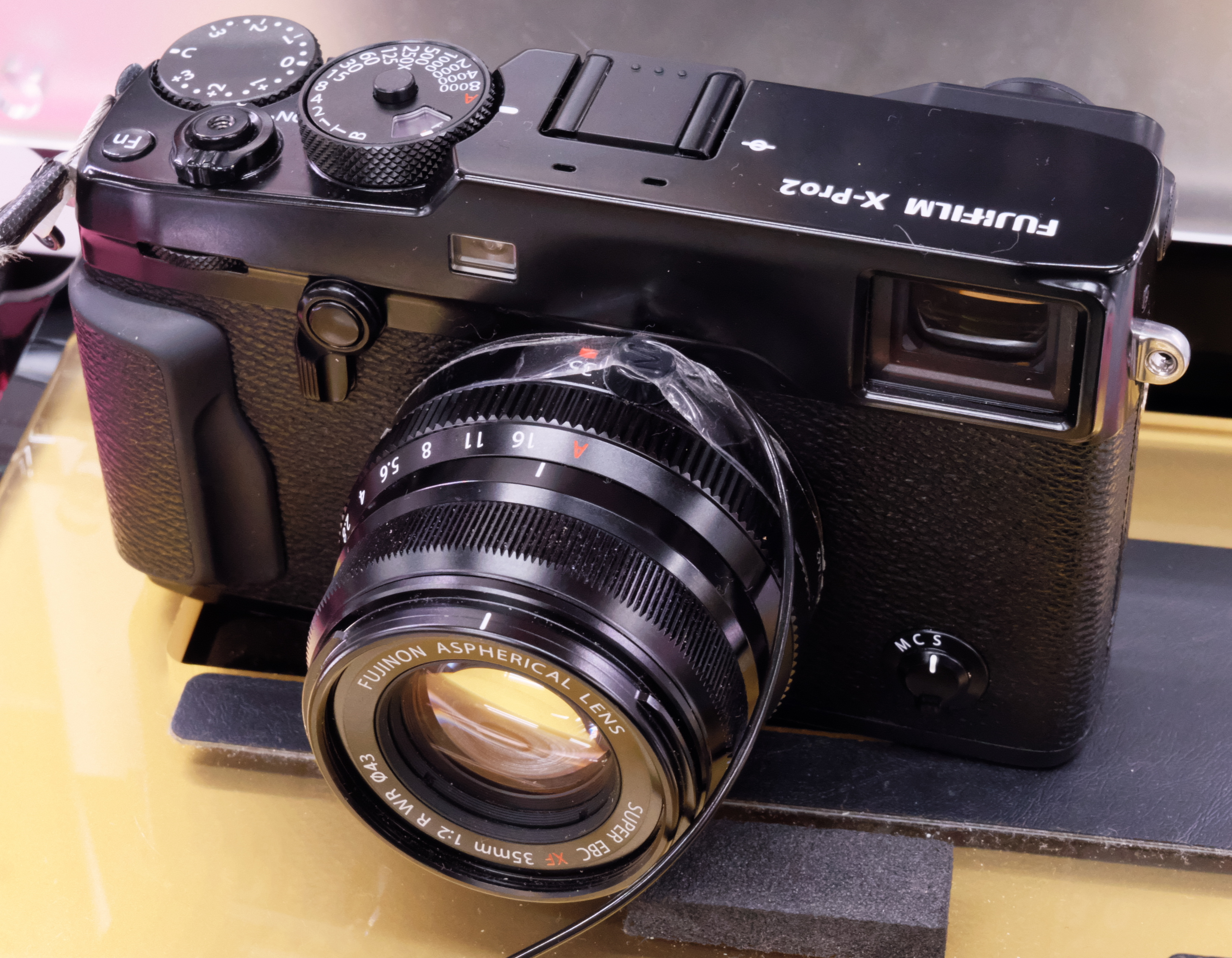
- X-Pro2 with XF 35mm F2 R WR lens

Overview
- Maker: Fujifilm
- Type: Mirrorless interchangeable lens camera

Lens
- Lens mount: Fujifilm X-mount

Sensor/medium
- Sensor type: X-Trans CMOS III
- Sensor size: 23.6 mm × 15.6 mm (APS-C)
- Sensor maker: Sony
- Maximum resolution: 24.3 megapixels
- Film speed: ISO 200–12800, expandable to 100–51200
- Recording medium: SD, SDHC, SDXC dual memory card slots

Focusing
- Focus: Phase detection

Exposure/metering
- Exposure: TTL 256 / 273-zones metering

Shutter
- Shutter speeds: 30 s to 1/8000 s (mechanical shutter); 1 s to 1/32000 s (electronic shutter)

Viewfinder
- Viewfinder: Hybrid (OVF and EVF)
- Image processor: X-Processor Pro

General
- Video recording: 4k at 30, 25, 24 fps 1080p at 24, 25, 30, 50, 60 fps
- Data port(s): USB 2.0, HDMI, 802.11/Wi-Fi
- Dimensions: 140.5 (W) × 82.8 (H) × 45.9 (D) mm
- Weight: 495 g (17 oz) (1.091 lb) (including battery and memory card)
- Made in: Japan

Chronology
- Predecessor: Fujifilm X-Pro1
- Successor: Fujifilm X-Pro3

The Fujifilm X-Pro2 is a mirrorless interchangeable-lens digital camera announced in January 2016. It is part of Fujifilm's X-Series of cameras, the successor to the X-Pro1. Sales began on 3 March 2016.

The X-Pro2 is the first mirrorless interchangeable-lens camera to have dual SD card slots. Fujifilm made some changes to the layout from the X-Pro1 and added a joystick.

The X-Pro2 jointly won a Camera Grand Prix Japan 2016 Editors Award.

The successor to the X-Pro2 is the Fujifilm X-Pro3 announced in October 2019.

== Features ==
The Fujifilm X-Pro2 mirrorless camera is aimed at professional and ambitious amateur photographers. The camera body has a X mount for connecting Fujinon XF and XC lenses. The autofocus system works as a hybrid using contrast and phase detection, this allows focusing and release within 0.15 to 0.25 seconds from infinity to two meters. For manual focusing, a focus magnifier, a digital split image indicator as well as focus peaking are available to the user. The camera allows one to capture 30 raw or about 140 JPEG shots at up to eight frames per second, assuming a SDXC-UHS-II memory card. The mechanical shutter allows exposure times of 30 to 1/8000 seconds, using the electronic shutter will allow shutter speeds up to 1/32,000 second.

In addition to a fixed rear LCD, the camera has a hybrid optical viewfinder. This is a combination of optical (OVF) and electronic viewfinder (EVF) and allows the photographer to superimpose information into the optical viewfinder field. A selection lever can be used to switch to the electronic viewfinder with 2.36 million pixels and 100% viewfinder coverage.

The X-Pro2 does not have automatic modes, HDR or panorama functions. Like its predecessor, the X-Pro1, it features various Fujifilm-typical film simulations. In addition, the user is provided with functions for automatic exposure, white balance, dynamic range and film simulation series.

With the built-in Wi-Fi function, the X-Pro2 can be controlled remotely via a smartphone or tablet.

== Fujifilm “X-Trans” CMOS Sensor ==
The camera is equipped with a Fujifilm X-Trans Sensor-III, which has an APS-C 23.6 × 15.6 mm format, a resolution of 24.3 megapixels and a pixel pitch of 3.9 μm. In contrast to Bayer CMOS sensor, this type features a different structure, which thus enables a different sampling method and eliminates the need for an optical low-pass filter (OLPF). The absence of a low-pass filter has a positive effect on the image resolution.

== Key specifications ==
- 24.3-megapixel, APS-C sized X-Trans CMOS III sensor
- Compatible with the Fujifilm X-mount system of lenses
- ISO 200–12800, expandable to ISO 100–51200
- Video/movie recording at 1080p at 60 fps, or at 4k at 30 fps (4k requires firmware 4.0 or later)
- Hybrid OLED/optical viewfinder
- 1/8000 s mechanical shutter
- Dual memory card slots (a first for any mirrorless interchangeable-lens camera)
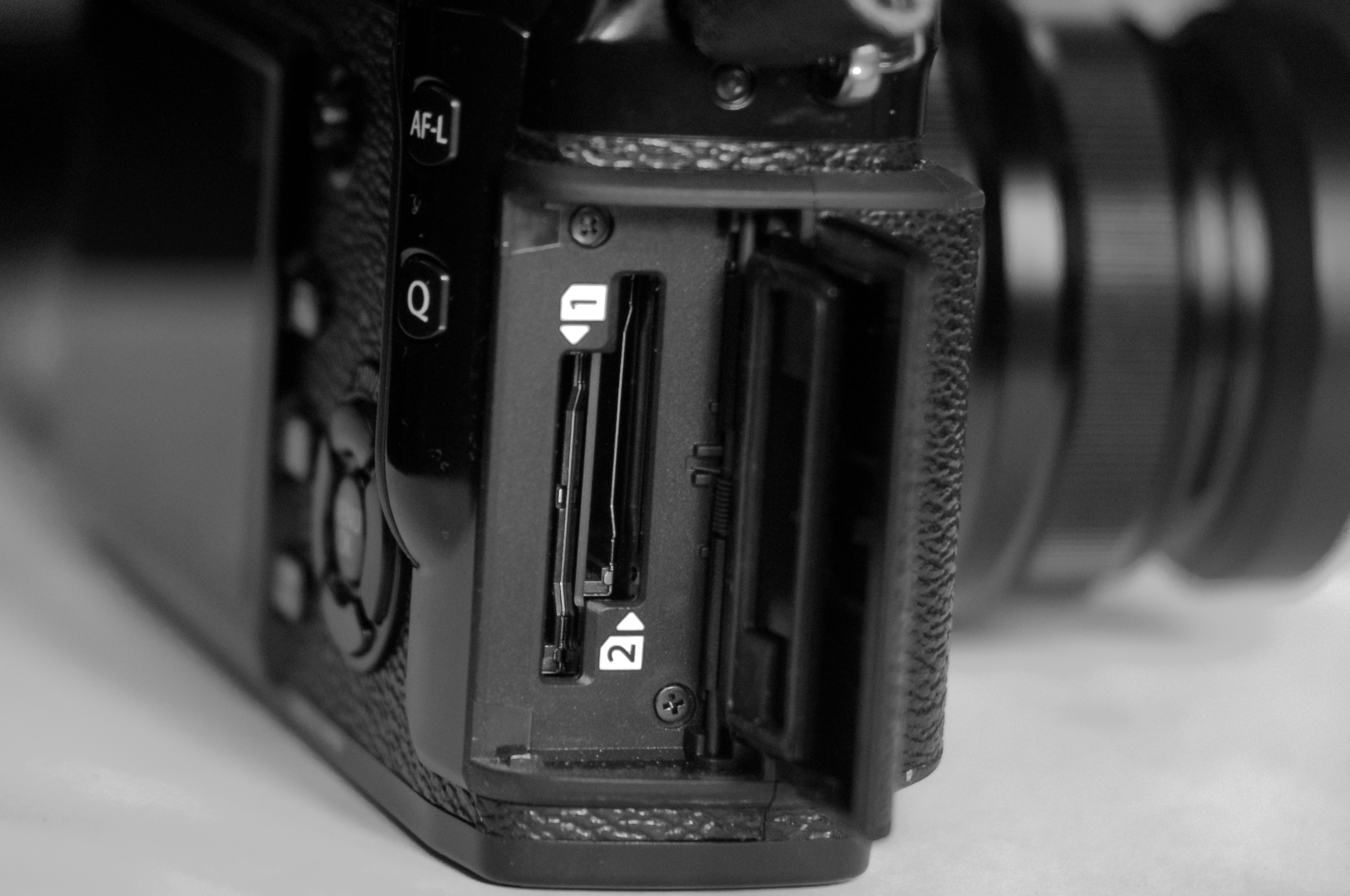

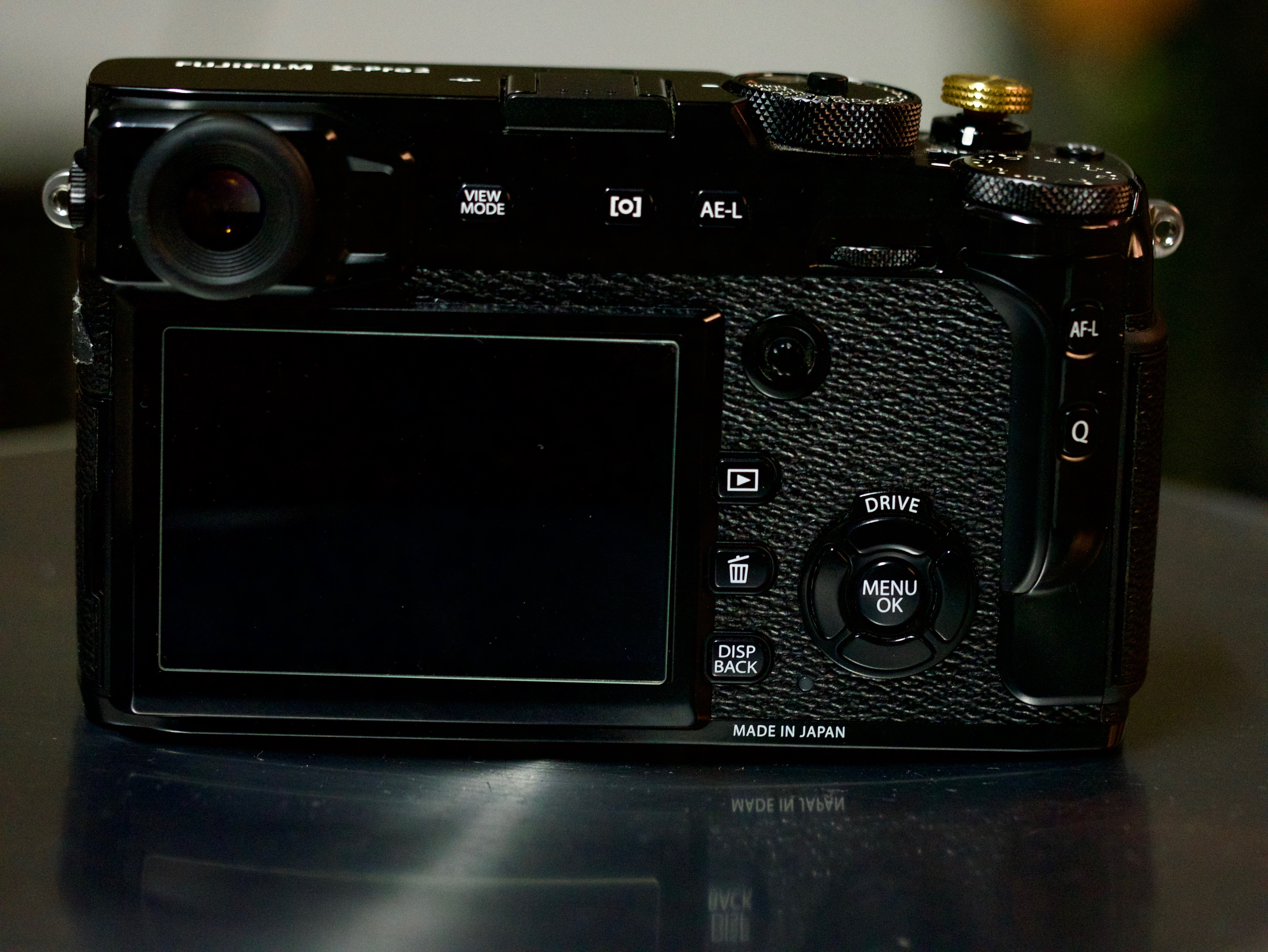

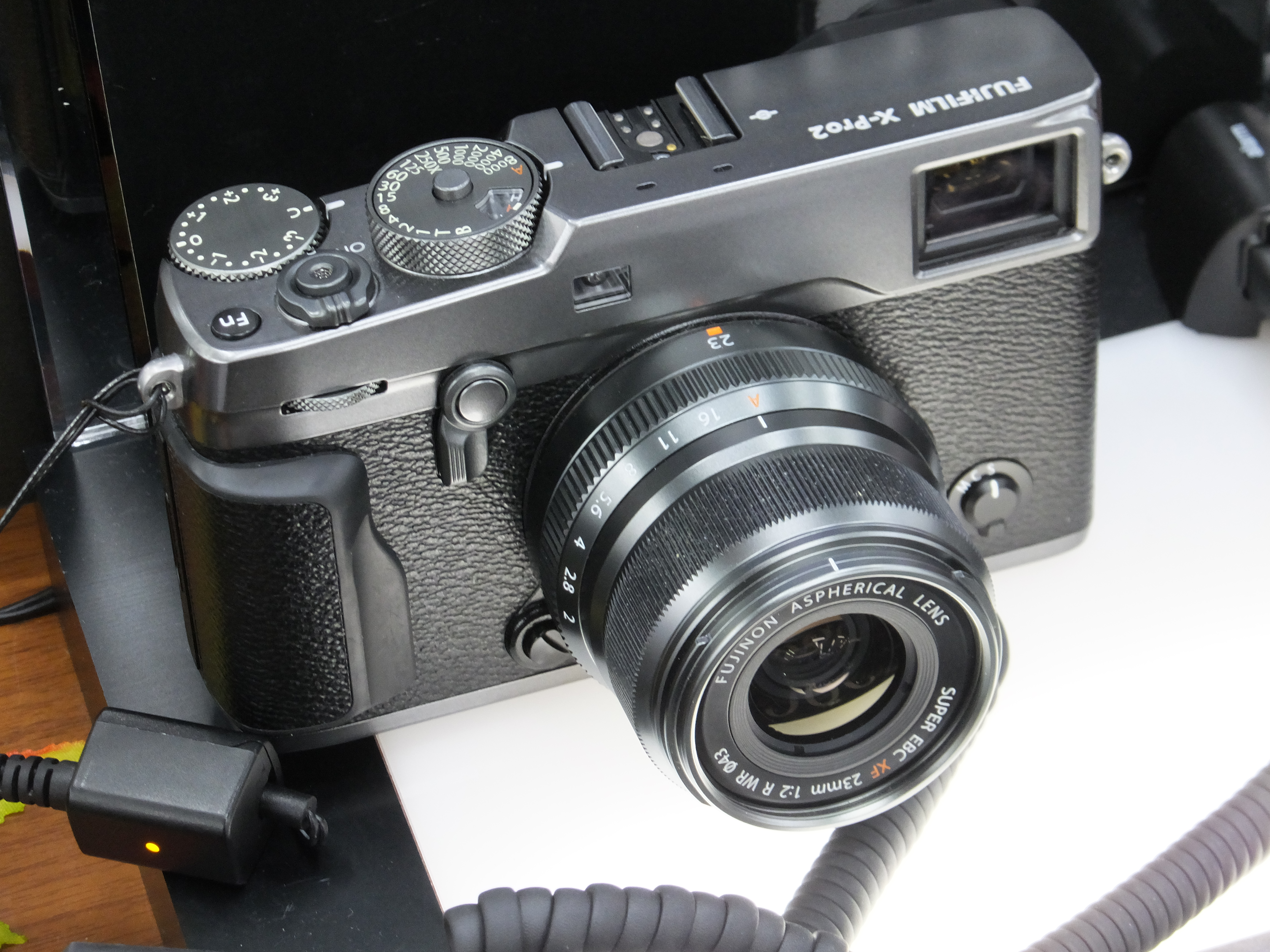

== See also ==
- List of retro-style digital cameras

Type	Lens	2011	2012	2013	2014	2015	2016	2017	2018	2019	2020	2021	2022	2023	2024	2025
MILC	G-mount; Medium format sensor							GFX 50S ^{F} ^{T}					GFX 50S II ^{F} ^{T}			
MILC	G-mount; Medium format sensor									GFX 50R ^{F} ^{T}						
MILC	G-mount; Medium format sensor										GFX 100 ^{F} ^{T}					GFX 100 II ^{F} ^{T}
MILC	G-mount; Medium format sensor											GFX 100 IR ^{F} ^{T}				
MILC	G-mount; Medium format sensor											GFX 100S ^{F} ^{T}				GFX 100S II^{F} ^{T}
MILC	G-mount; Medium format sensor															GFX Eterna 55^{F} ^{T}
MILC	Prime lens Medium format sensor															GFX 100RF ^{F} ^{T}
MILC	X-mount; APS-C sensor		X-Pro1				X-Pro2				X-Pro3 ^{f} ^{T}					
MILC	X-mount; APS-C sensor								X-H1 ^{F} ^{T}					X-H2 ^{A} ^{T}		
MILC	X-mount; APS-C sensor													X-H2S ^{A} ^{T}		
MILC	X-mount; APS-C sensor											X-S10 ^{A} ^{T}			X-S20 ^{A} ^{T}	
MILC	X-mount; APS-C sensor				X-T1 ^{f}			X-T2 ^{F}		X-T3 ^{F} ^{T}		X-T4 ^{A} ^{T}		X-T5 ^{F} ^{T}		
MILC	X-mount; APS-C sensor						X-T10 ^{f}	X-T20 ^{f} ^{T}		X-T30 ^{f} ^{T}			X-T30 II ^{f} ^{T}			X-T50 ^{f} ^{T}
MILC	X-mount; APS-C sensor									_{15} X-T100 ^{F} ^{T}	X-T200 ^{A} ^{T}					X-T30 III ^{f} ^{T}
MILC	X-mount; APS-C sensor			X-E1	X-E2		X-E2s		X-E3 ^{T}			X-E4 ^{f} ^{T}				X-E5 ^{f} ^{T}
MILC	X-mount; APS-C sensor				X-M1 ^{f}											X-M5 ^{A} ^{T}
MILC	X-mount; APS-C sensor				X-A1 ^{f}	X-A2 ^{f}		X-A3 ^{f} ^{T}	_{15} X-A5 ^{f} ^{T}		X-A7 ^{A} ^{T}					
MILC	X-mount; APS-C sensor							X-A10 ^{f}	X-A20 ^{f} ^{T}							
Compact	Prime lens APS-C sensor	X100		X100S		X100T		X100F			X100V ^{f} ^{T}				X100VI ^{f} ^{T}	
Compact	Prime lens APS-C sensor						X70 ^{f} ^{T}			XF10 ^{T}						
Compact	Prime lens 1" sensor															X half ^{T}
Compact	Zoom lens^{2}/_{3}" sensor		X10	X20		X30 ^{f}										
Compact	Zoom lens^{2}/_{3}" sensor				XQ1	XQ2										
Compact	Zoom lens^{2}/_{3}" sensor			XF1												
Bridge	^{2}/_{3}" sensor		X-S1 ^{f}													
Type	Lens															
Type	Lens	2011	2012	2013	2014	2015	2016	2017	2018	2019	2020	2021	2022	2023	2024	2025
