= Fujifilm X series =

Digital cameras produced by Fujifilm

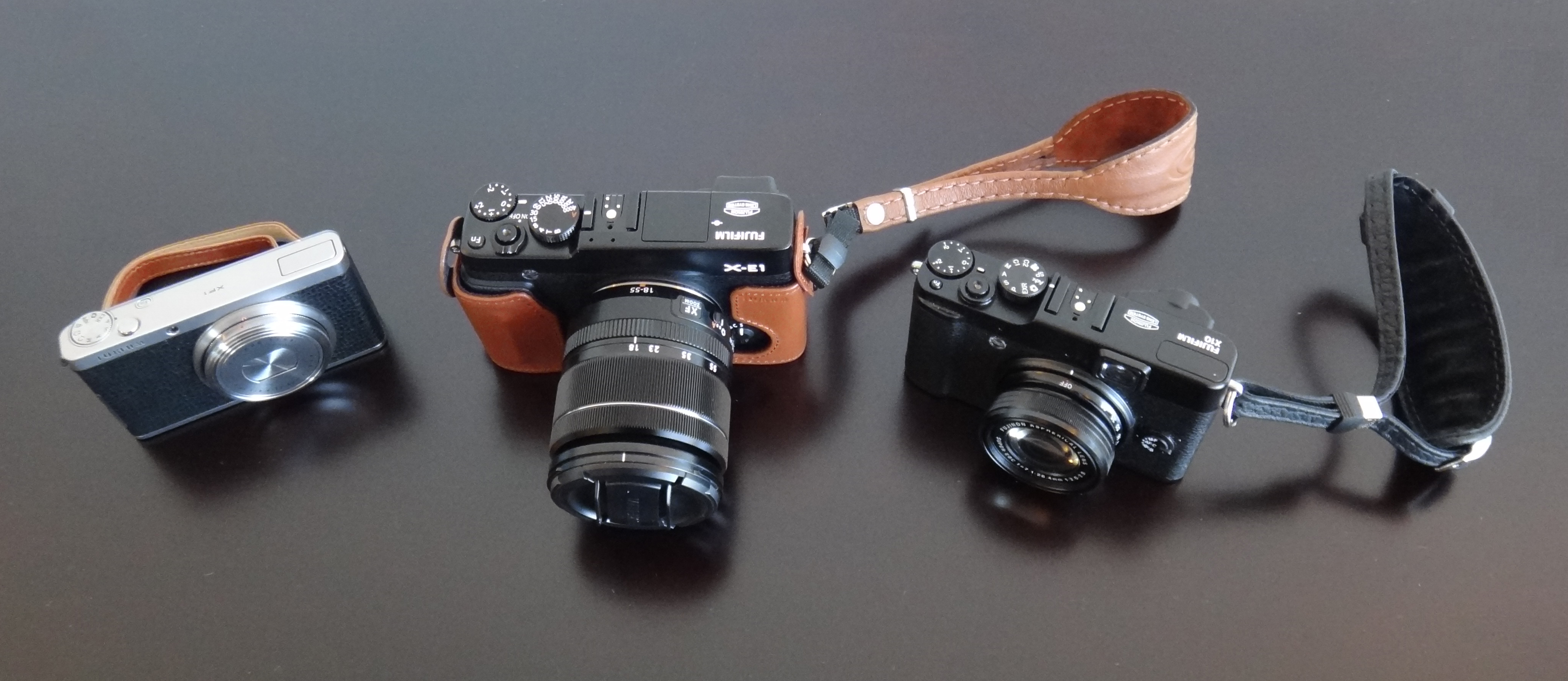
Fujifilm XF1, X-E1 and X10

The Fujifilm X series is a line of digital cameras produced by Fujifilm. The series encompasses fixed lens and interchangeable lens mirrorless cameras and premium compact point-and-shoot cameras aimed at consumer, enthusiast and professional photographers.

The X series models use APS-C, one-inch, or 2/3-inch sensors.

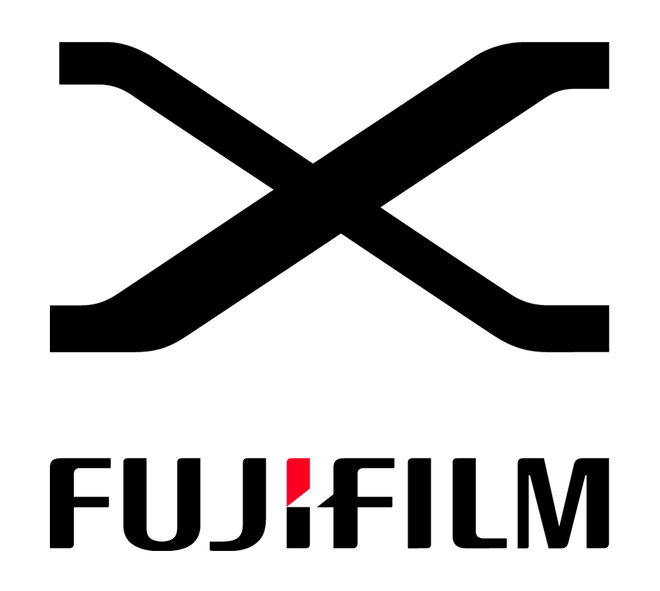
Fujifilm X series logo

- X line (small sensor) — The X10 was the first model in this line when it debuted in late 2011. Models in this line feature a fixed zoom lens and a rangefinder-style body with an optical tunnel viewfinder. There have been three such models as of 2021.
- X-S line (small sensor) — The X-S1 is the sole model in this category. It is a DSLR-styled, super-zoom, bridge camera with a fixed lens.
- XF line (small sensor) — The XF1 was released in September 2012. It is a compact, fixed lens zoom with no viewfinder and an EXR sensor. As of 2021, it has no direct successor, although the XQ line is very similar.
- XQ line — The XQ line are compact cameras with fixed zoom lenses, X-Trans sensors and no viewfinders. The initial model, the XQ1, came out in October 2013. The XQ2 is the only other model in the line to date.

== X series chronology ==
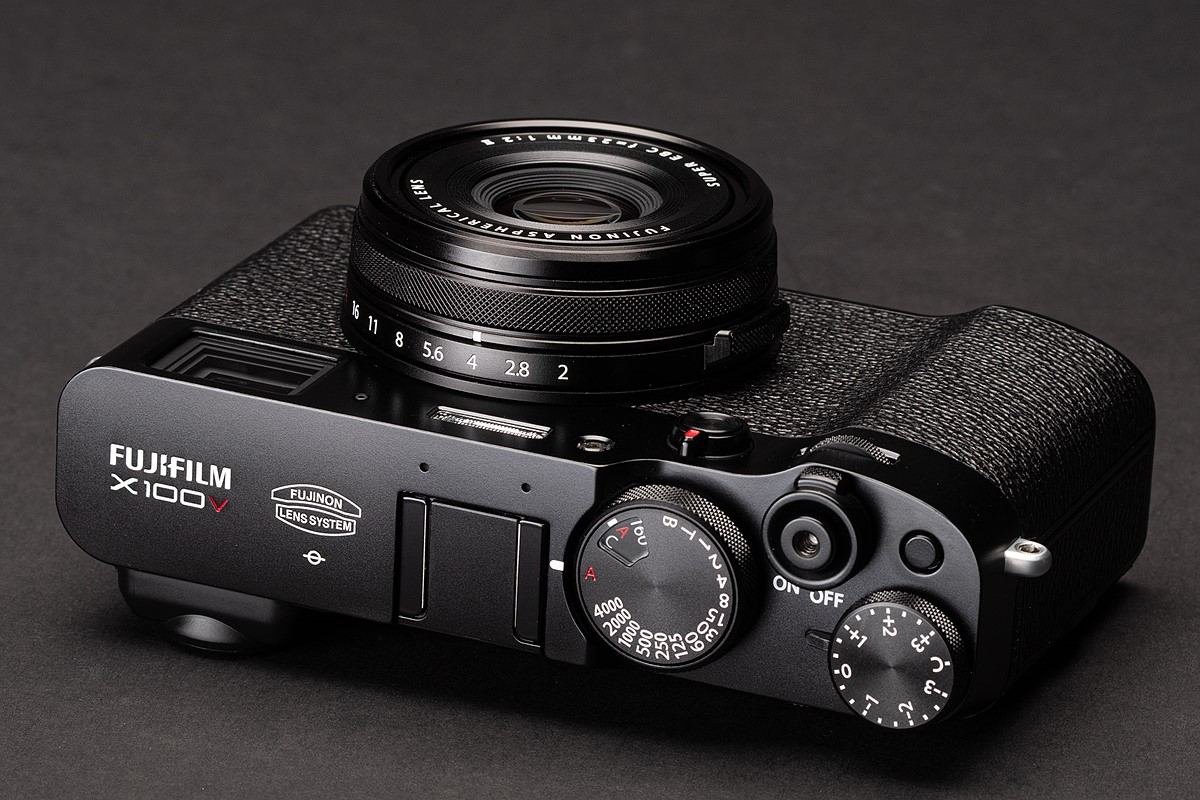
Fujifilm X100V

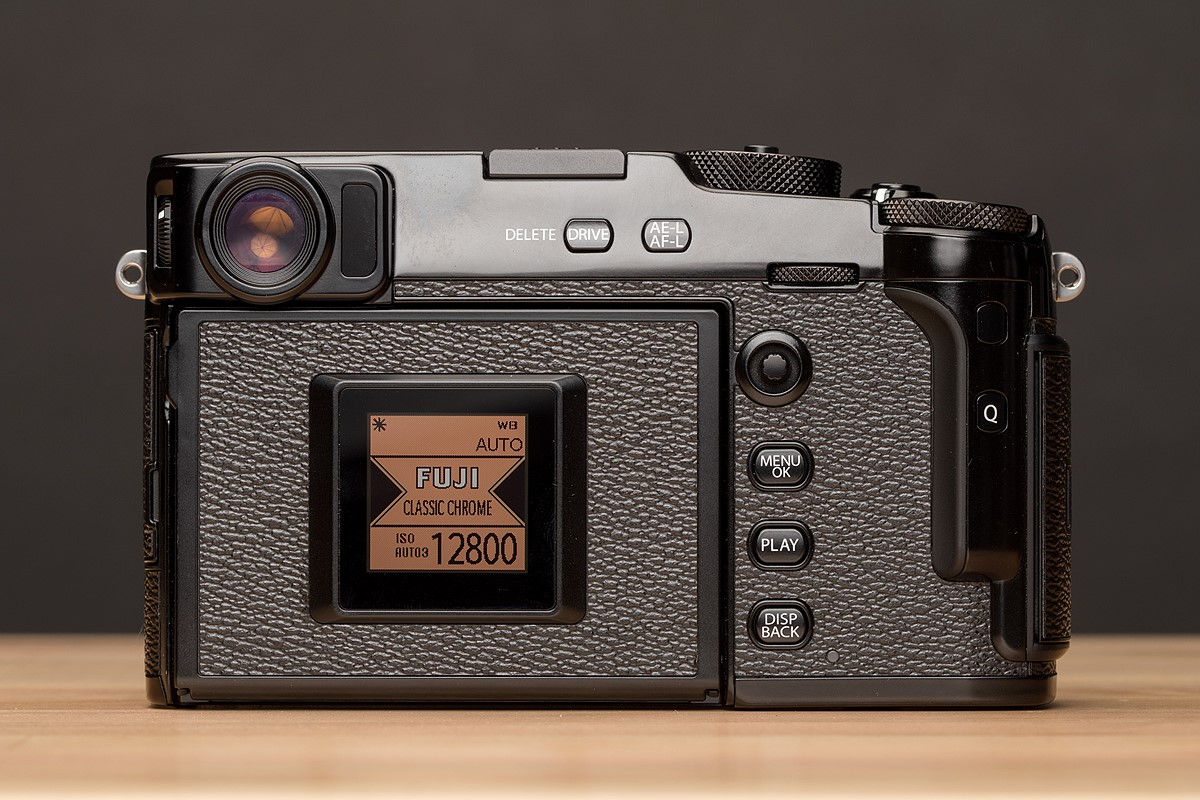
Fujifilm X-Pro 3

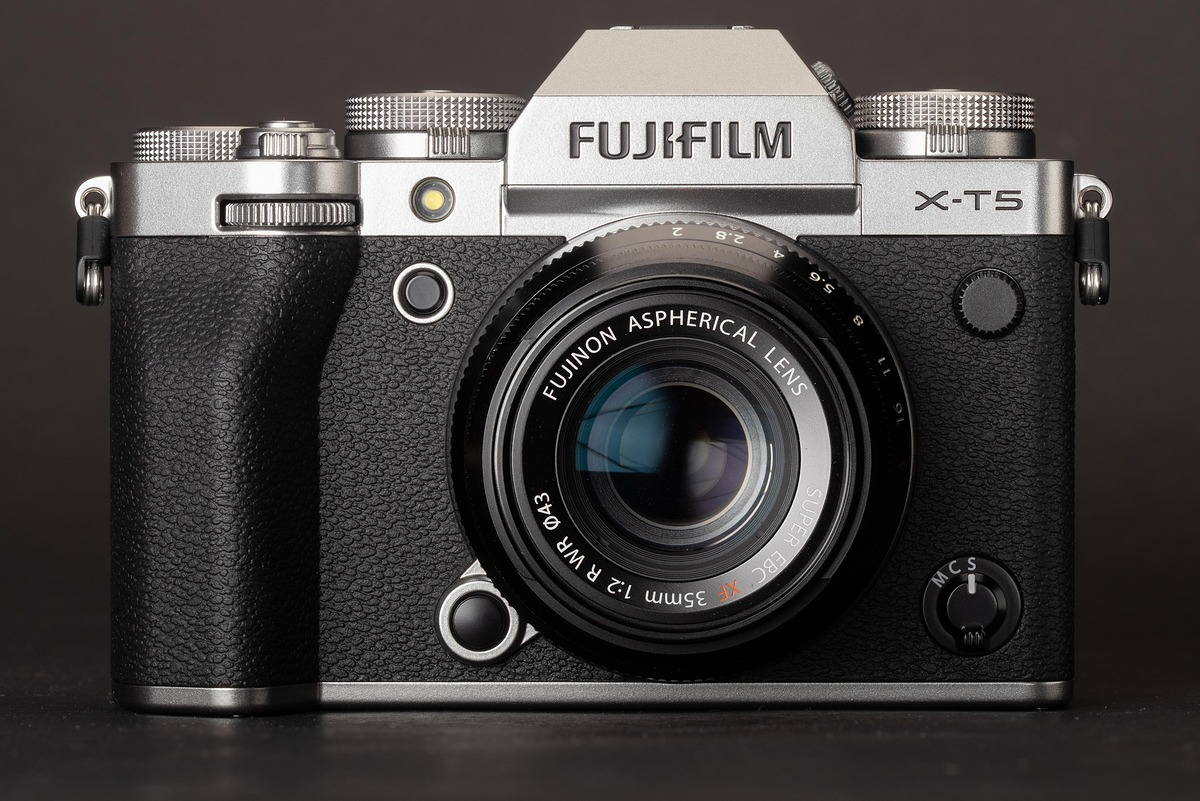
Fujifilm XT5

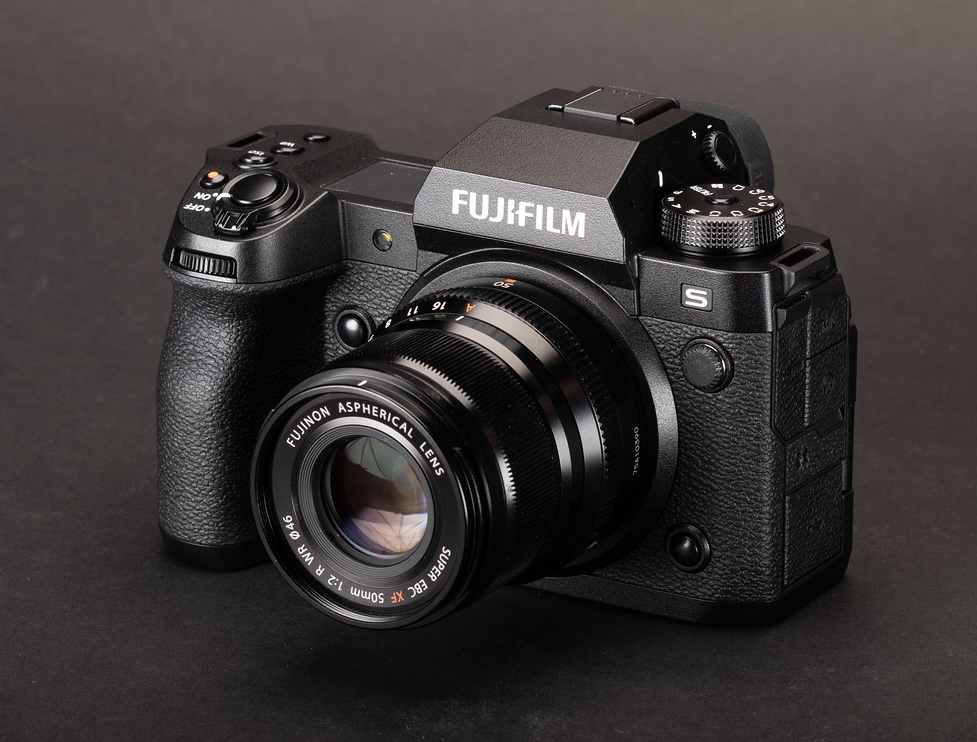
Fujifilm XH2S

Style	2011	2012	2013	2014	2015	2016	2017	2018	2019	2020	2021	2022	2023	2024	2025	2026
Rangefinder	FinePix X100		X100S		X100T		X100F			X100V				X100VI		
Point & shoot						X70			XF10							
Rangefinder		X-Pro1				X-Pro2				X-Pro3						
Rangefinder			X-E1	X-E2		X-E2s		X-E3			X-E4					X-E5
SLR (Classic)				X-T1			X-T2		X-T3	X-T4			X-T5			
SLR (Classic)						X-T10	X-T20			X-T30		X-T30 II			X-T50	
DSLR (Hybrid/PASM)								X-H1					X-H2			
DSLR (Hybrid/PASM)													X-H2S			
DSLR (Hybrid/PASM)											X-S10			X-S20		
Entry-level				X-M1											X-M5	
Entry-level				X-A1	X-A2		X-A3	X-A5		X-A7						
Entry-level							X-A10	X-A20								
Entry-level									X-T100	X-T200						
Rangefinder		X10	X20		X30											
Bridge		X-S1														
Point & shoot				XQ1	XQ2											
Point & shoot			XF1													
Entry-level																X-HF1

Lens: Fixed | Interchangeable Sensor: 1" | 2/3" | APS-C

Sensor: Bayer | EXR | X-Trans | X-Trans II | X-Trans III | X-Trans IV | X-Trans V

=== Active Camera Series (vertical view) ===
Style	Rangefinder			SLR (Classic)		DSLR (Hybrid/PASM)			Entry Level	
Series	X100	XPro	X-E	X-T*	X-T**	X-H*	X-H*S	X-S**	X-M*	X-HF*
2025										
2025			X-E5							X-HF1
2024									X-M5	
2024					X-T50					
2024	X100VI									
2023										
2023								X-S20		
2022			(dis.)	X-T5						
2022						X-H2	X-H2S			
2022					X-T30 II					
2021										
2021			X-E4							
2020								X-S10		
2020				X-T4						
2020	X100V									
2019		X-Pro3								
2019					X-T30					
2018										
2018				X-T3						
2018						X-H1				
2017			X-E3							
2017	X100F				X-T20					
2016										
2016			X-E2s	X-T2						
2016		X-Pro2							(dis.)	
2015										
2015					X-T10					
2014	X100T									
2014				X-T1						
2013			X-E2							
2013									X-M1	
2013	X100S									
2012			X-E1							
2012		X-Pro1								
2011										
2011	FinePix X100									

=== X series models ===
Cameras and camera bodies released by Fujifilm as a part of the X series, in chronological order:

- Fujifilm FinePix X100: Prime lens compact digital camera with custom APS-C sized CMOS sensor and hybrid viewfinder, and fixed 23 mm f/2.0 Fujinon lens. Announced at Photokina, the X100 launched globally in March 2011.
- Fujifilm X10: Advanced compact with a 2/3 inch (17 mm) 12 megapixel (MP), and a high-definition f/2.0 wide-angle and f/2.8 telephoto Fujinon 4x manual zoom lens (28–112 mm). Introduced Fujifilm's EXR-CMOS sensor, a variation on the Bayer filter pattern. Announced September 1, 2011. Succeeded by Fujifilm X20.
- Fujifilm X-S1: Advanced enthusiast's camera with the same 2/3 inch (17 mm) 12 MP EXR-CMOS sensor as the X10 compact. It has a fixed 26X zoom providing range equivalent to 24–624 mm at f/2.8-5.6 aperture. Announced November 24, 2011.
- Fujifilm X-Pro1: Mirrorless interchangeable-lens camera that uses the "X-Trans CMOS" sensor and the Fujifilm X-mount system of lenses. It was announced on January 10, 2012, and launched in March 2012.
- Fujifilm X-E1: Mirrorless interchangeable-lens camera which is a slimmed-down version of X-Pro1. The modifications include replacing the expensive hybrid viewfinder with an upgraded electronic viewfinder; the new EVF uses a 2.36M dot OLED unit, out-speccing the X-Pro1's 1.44M dot LCD finder. It was announced on September 6, 2012.
- Fujifilm XF1: Enthusiast's compact camera with 2/3 inch EXR-CMOS sensor and Fujinon f/1.8 lens with a 4× optical zoom (25 mm–100 mm equivalent). It was announced on September 17, 2012.
- Fujifilm X20: Replacement for the X10 enthusiast compact camera with 2/3 inch X-Trans CMOS II sensor, EXR Processor II and a new advanced optical viewfinder. It was announced on January 7, 2013. Succeeded by Fujifilm X30.
- Fujifilm X100S: Redesigned version of the X100 with new sensor-based phase detection. It was announced January 7, 2013. Introduced Fujifilm's Digital Split Image technology, allowing manual focus that appears to the user similar to a rangefinder camera's coincidence or split-image function.
- Fujifilm X-M1: Announced June 25, 2013. It is the smallest X series model with an APS-C X-Trans sensor and an articulating screen.
- Fujifilm X-A1: Lowest priced interchangeable lens camera in the line-up, without X-Trans sensor, announced on September 17, 2013.
- Fujifilm X-E2: Successor to the X-E1, with an X-Trans CMOS II sensor (same as the X100S), larger 3 in (76 mm) screen with higher resolution (1.04 M), Digital Split Image technology, and wi-fi. Announced on October 18, 2013.
- Fujifilm XQ1: Premium compact camera with X-Trans CMOS II sensor. Announced on October 18, 2013.
- Fujifilm X-T1: Mirrorless interchangeable-lens camera with a weather-sealed body, X-Trans CMOS II sensor, and tilting LCD screen. Announced on January 27, 2014. Also the first X series camera with an optional battery grip, and the first camera from any manufacturer to fully support UHS-II SD cards.
- Fujifilm X30: Successor to the X20. Announced August 26, 2014.
- Fujifilm X100T: Successor to the X100S. Announced September 10, 2014.
- Fujifilm X-A2: Mirrorless interchangeable-lens camera. Successor to the X-A1. Announced January 15, 2015.
- Fujifilm XQ2: Successor to the XQ1.
- Fujifilm X-T10: Mirrorless interchangeable-lens camera. Mass market version of X-T1.
- Fujifilm X-T1 IR: A full-spectrum version of the X-T1 useful for capturing infrared photographs. It was developed and marketed specifically for law enforcement (forensic) as well as medical and scientific applications.
- Fujifilm X-Pro2: Mirrorless interchangeable-lens camera, successor to the X-Pro1, with a new 24 MP X-Trans III sensor and higher resolution EVF. Announced January 15, 2016.
- Fujifilm X-E2S: Mirrorless interchangeable-lens camera, minor update to the X-E2. Announced January 15, 2016.
- Fujifilm X70: Smaller version of the Fujifilm X100T, with an 18.5 mm lens (28 mm-equivalent) rather than a 23 mm (35 mm-equivalent) on the X100/S/T. Announced January 15, 2016.
- Fujifilm X-T2: Upgraded model from X-T1 with similar weather-sealed body but same sensor and image processor as X-Pro2. Announced July 7, 2016.
- Fujifilm X-A3: Upgraded model from the X-A2, with 24.2 MP CMOS sensor, 11 types of film simulations, and rear LCD with touchscreen.
- Fujifilm X-A10: Entry-model camera, detuned from X-A2. Without accessory shoe. Sold worldwide except Japan.
- Fujifilm X100F: Successor to X100T. Equipped with the same sensor and processor as X-Pro2. Focus lever on the back of the body, built-in ISO dial on the top.
- Fujifilm X-T20: Successor to X-T10. Same sensor and processor as X-T2. The tilt LCD on the back of the body becomes a touch panel; it also supports touch-autofocus and touch-shooting.
- Fujifilm X-E3: Mirrorless interchangeable-lens camera, successor to X-E2s. Equipped with the same sensor and processor as X100F, X-Pro2, X-T2 and X-T20. The D-Pad has been replaced by swiping motions on the Touchscreen. Announced September 7, 2017.
- Fujifilm X-A5: Successor to X-A3. Improved autofocus with new CMOS sensor and processor, new high dynamic range, and 4K movie shooting modes. New kit lens with XC 15 mm–45 mm f/3.5-5.3 OIS PZ. Announced January 31, 2018 and on sale beginning on February 15, 2018.
- Fujifilm X-A20: Similar specifications to X-A10 with an addition of a touch sensitive LCD. The X-A20 was limited to primarily Asian markets.
- Fujifilm X-H1: Based on X-T2, newly equipped with In-Body Image Stabilizer (IBIS),10000 compute per second, stabilizing is effective with all genuine lenses. Announced February 15, 2018 and available from March 1, 2018.
- Fujifilm X-T100: Largely based on the X-A5 and is nearly identical to X-T20, equipped with an electronic viewfinder, a fully articulating touchscreen (3-way tilt) and a hybrid autofocus. Announced 2018 May 24.
- Fujifilm XF10: Successor to X70, but equipped with the same 24 megapixel Bayer sensor as the X-A5 & X-T100. Announced on July 19, 2018.
- Fujifilm X-T3: Successor to X-T2, but equipped with a new 26 MP X-Trans IV sensor. 3" tilting screen. ISO sensitivity to 51200. 4K/60P 4:2:2 10-bit (HDMI) and 4K/60P 4:2:0 10-bit (SD Card). Announced September 6, 2018.
- Fujifilm X-T30: Successor to X-T20, but equipped with 26 megapixel sensor. 3" tilting screen. ISO sensitivity to 51200. Announced February 14, 2019.
- Fujifilm X-A7: Successor the X-A5, equipped the new 24.2MP APS-C CMOS image sensor. 3.5" fully articulating touch screen. It can record 4K/30fps videos. Announced September 12, 2019.
- Fujifilm X-Pro3: Mirrorless interchangeable-lens camera, successor to the X-Pro2, with the 4th generation 26.1MP X-Trans. Announced October 23, 2019.
- Fujifilm X-T200: Successor the X-T100, equipped the new 24.2MP APS-C CMOS image sensor. 3.5" fully articulating touch screen. It features a digital gimbal and a digital image stabilization. It can record 4K videos is 30P. Announced January 23, 2020.
- Fujifilm X100V: Successor to X100F. Equipped with the 4th generation 26.1MP X-Trans. A new two-way tilting touchscreen LCD that folds down flush with the back of the bod is also equipped in the camera. Announced February 4, 2020.
- Fujifilm X-T4: Successor to X-T3, equipped with fully articulating screen, new battery and in-body stabilization. Announced on February 26, 2020.
- Fujifilm X-S10: First of its generation, a mid-range camera equipped with a in-body image stabilization and a fully articulating screen. Announced on October 15, 2020.
- Fujifilm X-E4: Mirrorless interchangeable-lens camera, successor to X-E3. Thinner than its predecessor and contains no grip. Announced on January 27, 2021.
- Fujifilm X-T30 II: An update to the X-T30. Compared to the X-T30, the new model has a higher resolution LCD and additional memory to improve overall performance. Announced September 2, 2021 and will be available in late October 2021.
- Fujifilm X-H2S: The X-H2S has a resolution of 26 MP. It is the successor of the X-H1 from 2018. X-H2S is the first digital camera to incorporate the new X-trans CMOS 5 HS imaging sensor, which is both stacked and backside-illuminated, allowing it to read data four times faster than Fujifilm's previous X-Trans CMOS 4 sensor.
- Fujifilm X-H2: The X-H2 is the latest camera teased by Fujifilm on May 31, 2022, and released on September 9, 2022. It featured a new X-Trans CMOS 5 HR 40 MP non-stacked sensor.
- Fujifilm X-T5: Successor to X-T4, equipped with the 40 MP sensor which debuted in the X-H2. Announced November 2, 2022.
- Fujifilm X-S20: Second of its generation, a mid-range camera announced on May 24, 2023. The X-S20 is equipped with a 26.1 MP X-Trans BSI CMOS 4 Sensor.
- Fujifilm X100VI: Successor to X100V. Equipped with the 5th generation 40.2 MP X-Trans CMOS 5 HR sensor. Announced February 4, 2024.
- Fujifilm X-T50: Positioned as a non-successor to the X-T30. Equipped with the 40.2MP APS-C X-Trans CMOS 5 HR sensor. Announced May 16, 2024.
- Fujifilm X-M5: Entry level small and lightweight body without an EVF. Equipped with the 26.1MP APS-C X-Trans 4 CMOS sensor. Announced October 14, 2024.
- Fujifilm X half: Announced May 22, 2025. The X-Half is a compact digital camera based on traditional half-frame film cameras. Equipped with 1-inch back-illuminated sensor and 10.8mm F2.8 prime lens.
- Fujifilm X-E5: Successor to X-E4, ILC version of X100VI when paired with the simultaneously announced XF 23mm f/2.8 R WR pancake lens. Equipped with the 5th generation 40.2 MP X-Trans CMOS 5 HR sensor. Announced June 12, 2025.

== Fujifilm X-mount lenses ==
All X series cameras with interchangeable lenses use Fujifilm X-mount lenses. The first such lenses were introduced along with the X-Pro1 in early 2012. The original three lenses for the new system were a set of fixed-focal length prime lenses: an 18mm f/2 wide-angle, a 35mm f/1.4 standard and a 60mm f/2.4 macro lens. The first X-mount zoom lens, an 18-55mm f/2.8–4, was released later in 2012.

As of 2021, Fujifilm has released over 35 lenses for the system, all of which offer autofocus. In addition, a host of third-party companies have extended the selection to over 200 lenses, many of which are manual focus only.

== X series accessories ==
A wide variety of accessories for X series cameras and X-mount lenses have been introduced, both from Fujifilm and from third party suppliers. These include lens mount adapters; conversion lenses; camera grips; camera cases; lens hoods, caps, and filters; flashes and flash accessories; microphones; remote releases; and batteries and chargers.

=== Lens adapters ===
Due to the short 17.7mm flange focal distance of the Fujifilm X mount, lenses from a vast array of other systems can be adapted for use on X series cameras. An adapter to allow use of Leica M-mount lenses on X-mount cameras is offered by Fujifilm. This adapter provides a way to set the focal length of the lens which will appear in image Exif info, and correct for common color shift and vignetting problems when using M-mount lenses on digital cameras.

=== Conversion lenses ===
- Wide conversion lens WCL-X100

=== Camera grips ===
- Fujifilm hand grip HG-XPro1

=== Camera cases ===
- Fujifilm leather softcase

=== Flashes and accessories ===
- Fujifilm EF-X20 shoe-mount flash a dedicated TTL flash with 20 mm equivalent angle using the built-in defuser. Guide number 20' (6.1 m) ISO100 at 50 mm position.

== See also ==
- Fujinon
- Fujifilm GFX series
- Fujifilm G-mount
- Comparison of Fujifilm X series cameras

Type	Lens	2011	2012	2013	2014	2015	2016	2017	2018	2019	2020	2021	2022	2023	2024	2025	2026
MILC	G-mount; Medium format sensor							GFX 50S ^{F} ^{T}					GFX 50S II ^{F} ^{T}				
MILC	G-mount; Medium format sensor									GFX 50R ^{F} ^{T}							
MILC	G-mount; Medium format sensor										GFX 100 ^{F} ^{T}					GFX 100 II ^{F} ^{T}	
MILC	G-mount; Medium format sensor											GFX 100 IR ^{F} ^{T}					
MILC	G-mount; Medium format sensor											GFX 100S ^{F} ^{T}				GFX 100S II ^{F} ^{T}	
MILC	G-mount; Medium format sensor															GFX Eterna 55 ^{F} ^{T}	
MILC	Prime lens Medium format sensor															GFX 100RF ^{F} ^{T}	
MILC	X-mount; APS-C sensor		X-Pro1				X-Pro2				X-Pro3 ^{f} ^{T}						
MILC	X-mount; APS-C sensor								X-H1 ^{F} ^{T}					X-H2 ^{A} ^{T}			
MILC	X-mount; APS-C sensor													X-H2S ^{A} ^{T}			
MILC	X-mount; APS-C sensor											X-S10 ^{A} ^{T}			X-S20 ^{A} ^{T}		
MILC	X-mount; APS-C sensor				X-T1 ^{f}			X-T2 ^{F}		X-T3 ^{F} ^{T}		X-T4 ^{A} ^{T}		X-T5 ^{F} ^{T}			
MILC	X-mount; APS-C sensor															X-T50 ^{f} ^{T}	
MILC	X-mount; APS-C sensor						X-T10 ^{f}	X-T20 ^{f} ^{T}		X-T30 ^{f} ^{T}			X-T30 II ^{f} ^{T}			X-T30 III ^{f} ^{T}	
MILC	X-mount; APS-C sensor									_{15} X-T100 ^{F} ^{T}	X-T200 ^{A} ^{T}						
MILC	X-mount; APS-C sensor			X-E1	X-E2		X-E2s		X-E3 ^{T}			X-E4 ^{f} ^{T}				X-E5 ^{f} ^{T}	
MILC	X-mount; APS-C sensor				X-M1 ^{f}											X-M5 ^{A} ^{T}	
MILC	X-mount; APS-C sensor				X-A1 ^{f}	X-A2 ^{f}		X-A3 ^{f} ^{T}	_{15} X-A5 ^{f} ^{T}		X-A7 ^{A} ^{T}						
MILC	X-mount; APS-C sensor							X-A10 ^{f}	X-A20 ^{f} ^{T}								
Compact	Prime lens APS-C sensor	X100		X100S		X100T		X100F			X100V ^{f} ^{T}				X100VI ^{f} ^{T}		
Compact	Prime lens APS-C sensor						X70 ^{f} ^{T}			XF10 ^{T}							
Compact	Prime lens 1" sensor															X half ^{T}	
Compact	Zoom lens^{2}/_{3}" sensor		X10	X20		X30 ^{f}											
Compact	Zoom lens^{2}/_{3}" sensor				XQ1	XQ2											
Compact	Zoom lens^{2}/_{3}" sensor			XF1													
Bridge	^{2}/_{3}" sensor		X-S1 ^{f}														
Type	Lens																
Type	Lens	2011	2012	2013	2014	2015	2016	2017	2018	2019	2020	2021	2022	2023	2024	2025	2026
