= Comparison of Fujifilm X series cameras =

The following tables compare general and technical information for Fujifilm X series cameras that support the Classic Chrome film simulation, USB charging, and other useful features. Models that are currently in production are shown in bold.

== Fixed-lens cameras ==
Model	Film simulations		4K 30p	Touch screen	Flip screen	OLED EVF	USB-C	IS	Weather sealing	Focal length (Note: 35mm equivalent.)	Aperture	Sensor size	Pixel count	Weight	Release year
Model	Classic Negative	Nostalgic Negative	4K 30p	Touch screen	Flip screen	OLED EVF	USB-C	IS	Weather sealing	Focal length	Aperture	Sensor size	Pixel count	Weight	Release year
**X100VI**	Yes	Yes	Yes	Yes	Tilt	Yes	Yes	IBIS	Partial (Note: Becomes fully weather sealed by attaching a filter to the lens via an adapter.)	35mm	f/2.0	APS-C	40 MP	521 g	2024
X100V	Yes	No	Yes	Yes	Tilt	Yes	Yes	No	Partial	35mm	f/2.0	APS-C	26 MP	478 g	2020
X100F	No	No	No	No	No	LCD	No	No	No	35mm	f/2.0	APS-C	24 MP	469 g	2017
X100T	No	No	No	No	No	LCD	No	No	No	35mm	f/2.0	APS-C	16 MP	440 g	2014
XF10	No	No	No	Yes	No	No	No	EIS	No	28mm	f/2.8	APS-C	24 MP	279 g	2018
X70	No	No	No	Yes	Yes	No	No	No	No	28mm	f/2.8	APS-C	16 MP	340 g	2016
X half	Yes	Yes	No	Yes	No	OVF	Yes	No	No	32mm	f/2.8	1″	18 MP	240 g	2025
X30	No	No	No	No	Tilt	OLED	No	OIS	No	28-112mm	f/2.0-2.8	2/3″	12 MP	423 g	2014
XQ2	No	No	No	No	No	No	No	OIS	No	25-100mm	f/1.8-4.9	2/3″	12 MP	206 g	2015

== Interchangeable-lens APS-C cameras ==
Model	Film simulations		4K 30p	6K 3:2 (Note: Full-sensor ("open gate") video recording.)	Flip screen	OLED EVF	USB-C	IS	Weather sealing	Pixel count	Weight	Release year
Model	Classic Negative	Nostalgic Negative	4K 30p	6K 3:2	Flip screen	OLED EVF	USB-C	IS	Weather sealing	Pixel count	Weight	Release year
**X-H2S**	Yes	Yes	Yes	Yes	Yes	0.80x	Yes	IBIS	Yes	26 MP	660 g	2022
**X-H2**	Yes	Yes	Yes	No	Yes	0.80x	Yes	IBIS	Yes	40 MP	660 g	2022
X-H1	No	No	Yes	No	Yes	0.75x	No	IBIS	Yes	24 MP	673 g	2018
X-Pro3	Yes	No	Yes	No	Tilt	0.66x	Yes	No	Yes	26 MP	497 g	2019
X-Pro2	No	No	No	No	No	0.59x	No	No	Yes	24 MP	495 g	2016
**X-T5**	Yes	Yes	Yes	No	Tilt	0.80x	Yes	IBIS	Yes	40 MP	557 g	2022
X-T4	Yes	No	Yes	No	Yes	0.75x	Yes	IBIS	Yes	26 MP	607 g	2020
X-T3	No	No	Yes	No	Tilt	0.75x	Yes	No	Yes	26 MP	539 g	2018
X-T2	No	No	Yes	No	Tilt	0.77x	No	No	Yes	24 MP	500 g	2016
X-T1	No	No	No	No	Tilt	0.77x	No	No	Yes	16 MP	440 g	2014
**X-S20**	Yes	Yes	Yes	Yes	Yes	0.62x	Yes	IBIS	No	26 MP	491 g	2023
X-S10	Yes	No	Yes	No	Yes	0.62x	Yes	IBIS	No	26 MP	465 g	2020
**X-T50**	Yes	Yes	Yes	No	Tilt	0.62x	Yes	IBIS	No	40 MP	438 g	2024
**X-T30 III**	Yes	Yes	Yes	Yes	Tilt	0.62x	Yes	No	No	26 MP	378 g	2025
**X-T30 II**	Yes	No	Yes	No	Tilt	0.62x	Yes	No	No	26 MP	378 g	2021
X-T30	No	No	Yes	No	Tilt	0.62x	Yes	No	No	26 MP	383 g	2019
**X-E5**	Yes	Yes	Yes	No	Yes	0.62x	Yes	IBIS	No	40 MP	445 g	2025
X-E4	Yes	No	Yes	No	Yes	0.62x	Yes	No	No	26 MP	364 g	2021
**X-M5**	Yes	Yes	Yes	Yes	Yes	No	Yes	EIS	No	26 MP	355 g	2024
X-T200	No	No	Yes	No	Yes	0.62x	Yes	EIS	No	24 MP	370 g	2020
X-A7	No	No	Yes	No	Yes	No	Yes	EIS	No	24 MP	320 g	2019
