= XS1 =

XS1 may refer to:

- The original designation, XS-1, of the Bell X-1, a supersonic prototype airplane designed and built by the United States in 1945
- XS-1 (spacecraft), a DARPA experimental spaceplane
- Fujifilm X-S1, a superzoom digital bridge camera released in November 2011
- XCore XS1 microprocessor
