= XF1 =

XF1 may refer to:

- Fujifilm XF1, digital compact camera
- South African type XF1 tender, steam locomotive tender
- The X Factor (British series 1), British TV series
- Radio callsign for the Baja California islands of Mexico - see Call signs in Mexico
