= Fujifilm X-A3 =

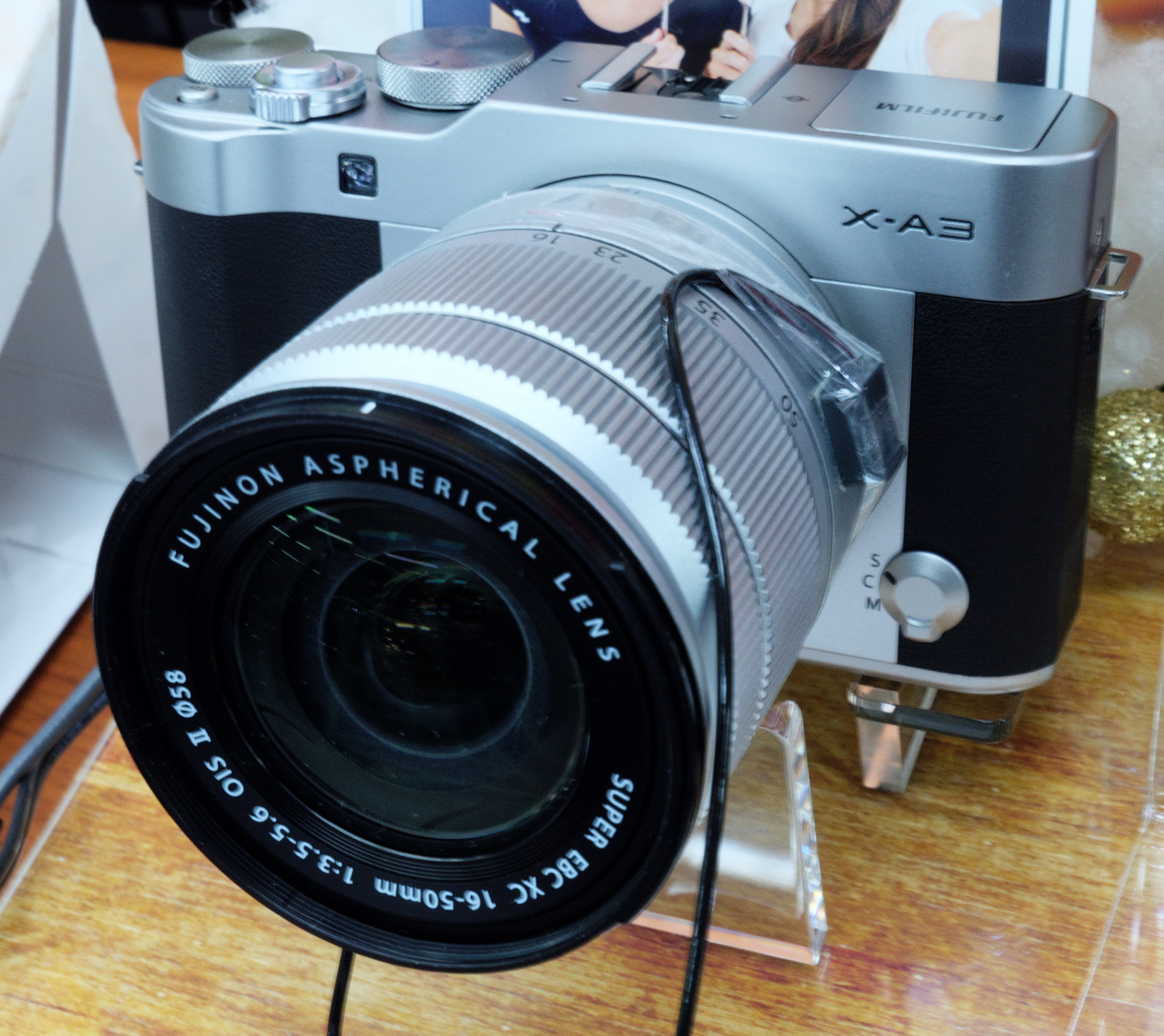
- Fujifilm X-A3 + XC16mm-50mm F3.5-5.6 OIS II

Overview
- Maker: Fujifilm
- Type: Mirrorless camera
- Released: November 10, 2016
- Intro price: USD 599 (body)

Lens
- Lens mount: Fujifilm X
- Lens: XC 16mm-50mm F3.5-5.6 OIS II (Interchangeable lens)

Sensor/medium
- Sensor type: CMOS with Bayer filter
- Sensor size: 23.5 mm × 15.7 mm (APS-C)
- Sensor maker: Sony
- Maximum resolution: 6000 x 4000 (24.2 megapixels)
- Film speed: 200–12800 (standard); 100–51200 (extend)
- Recording medium: SD, SDHC, SDXC (UHS-I)
- Storage media: SD card

Focusing
- Focus: Intelligent Hybrid TTL contrast detection / Phase detection
- Focus areas: 49 focus points

Exposure/metering
- Exposure: TTL 256-zones metering

Flash
- Flash: Manual pop-up flash

Shutter
- Shutter: Mechanical focal plane shutter with Electronical shutter
- Shutter speeds: 30 s to 1/4000 s (mechanical), 4 s to 1/32000 s (electronic)
- Continuous shooting: 6 frames per second

Viewfinder
- Viewfinder: none

Image processing
- Image processor: EXR Processor II
- White balance: Auto, Custom, Preset, Fluorescent, Incandescent

General
- Video recording: MP4; 1080p up to 60 fps
- LCD screen: 3.0 inches 1.04M dots tilt touchscreen
- Battery: NP-W126S Li-ion
- AV port(s): HDMI D
- Data port(s): USB 2.0, Wi-Fi 4
- Dimensions: 116.9 mm × 66.9 mm × 40.4 mm (4.60 in × 2.63 in × 1.59 in)
- Weight: 339 g (12 oz) (0.747 lb) including battery and memory card
- Made in: Thailand

Chronology
- Predecessor: Fujifilm X-A2
- Successor: Fujifilm X-A5

The Fujifilm X-A3 is a rangefinder-styled digital mirrorless camera announced by Fujifilm on August 25, 2016. Sales began on November 10, 2016.

== Features ==
The Fujifilm X-A3 is the first X-mount camera with a 180° LCD screen with touch-focus & touch-shooting. It is aimed at the growing selfie market, with new face detection and eye detection autofocus modes, for sharper results when taking Self portraits.

The Fujifilm X-A3 sports a regular Bayer filter sensor array, as opposed to the X-Trans sensor that is typical among the X-mount camera system.

The camera was designed in such a way that it could be used one handed, so all of the most used settings are within reach when using the camera in selfie mode.

This camera is only sold as a kit with the XC 16mm-50mm F3.5-5.6 OIS II; the camera body has not been sold alone.

== Key features ==
- 24 Megapixels
- 23.6 x 16.6mm CMOS sensor (APS-C)
- Touch screen
- 11 types of film simulations
- Improved autofocus like as X-T10
- TTL 256-zone metering, Multi / Spot / Average
- Face detection
- Eye detection
- 1080p HD video
- WiFi connectivity

== See also ==
- List of retro-style digital cameras

Type	Lens	2011	2012	2013	2014	2015	2016	2017	2018	2019	2020	2021	2022	2023	2024	2025
MILC	G-mount; Medium format sensor							GFX 50S ^{F} ^{T}					GFX 50S II ^{F} ^{T}			
MILC	G-mount; Medium format sensor									GFX 50R ^{F} ^{T}						
MILC	G-mount; Medium format sensor										GFX 100 ^{F} ^{T}					GFX 100 II ^{F} ^{T}
MILC	G-mount; Medium format sensor											GFX 100 IR ^{F} ^{T}				
MILC	G-mount; Medium format sensor											GFX 100S ^{F} ^{T}				GFX 100S II^{F} ^{T}
MILC	G-mount; Medium format sensor															GFX Eterna 55^{F} ^{T}
MILC	Prime lens Medium format sensor															GFX 100RF ^{F} ^{T}
MILC	X-mount; APS-C sensor		X-Pro1				X-Pro2				X-Pro3 ^{f} ^{T}					
MILC	X-mount; APS-C sensor								X-H1 ^{F} ^{T}					X-H2 ^{A} ^{T}		
MILC	X-mount; APS-C sensor													X-H2S ^{A} ^{T}		
MILC	X-mount; APS-C sensor											X-S10 ^{A} ^{T}			X-S20 ^{A} ^{T}	
MILC	X-mount; APS-C sensor				X-T1 ^{f}			X-T2 ^{F}		X-T3 ^{F} ^{T}		X-T4 ^{A} ^{T}		X-T5 ^{F} ^{T}		
MILC	X-mount; APS-C sensor						X-T10 ^{f}	X-T20 ^{f} ^{T}		X-T30 ^{f} ^{T}			X-T30 II ^{f} ^{T}			X-T50 ^{f} ^{T}
MILC	X-mount; APS-C sensor									_{15} X-T100 ^{F} ^{T}	X-T200 ^{A} ^{T}					
MILC	X-mount; APS-C sensor			X-E1	X-E2		X-E2s		X-E3 ^{T}			X-E4 ^{f} ^{T}				X-E5 ^{f} ^{T}
MILC	X-mount; APS-C sensor				X-M1 ^{f}											X-M5 ^{A} ^{T}
MILC	X-mount; APS-C sensor				X-A1 ^{f}	X-A2 ^{f}		X-A3 ^{f} ^{T}	_{15} X-A5 ^{f} ^{T}		X-A7 ^{A} ^{T}					
MILC	X-mount; APS-C sensor							X-A10 ^{f}	X-A20 ^{f} ^{T}							
Compact	Prime lens APS-C sensor	X100		X100S		X100T		X100F			X100V ^{f} ^{T}				X100VI ^{f} ^{T}	
Compact	Prime lens APS-C sensor						X70 ^{f} ^{T}			XF10 ^{T}						
Compact	Prime lens 1" sensor															X half ^{T}
Compact	Zoom lens^{2}/_{3}" sensor		X10	X20		X30 ^{f}										
Compact	Zoom lens^{2}/_{3}" sensor				XQ1	XQ2										
Compact	Zoom lens^{2}/_{3}" sensor			XF1												
Bridge	^{2}/_{3}" sensor		X-S1 ^{f}													
Type	Lens															
Type	Lens	2011	2012	2013	2014	2015	2016	2017	2018	2019	2020	2021	2022	2023	2024	2025
