= Fujifilm X half =

Fujifilm X-HF1
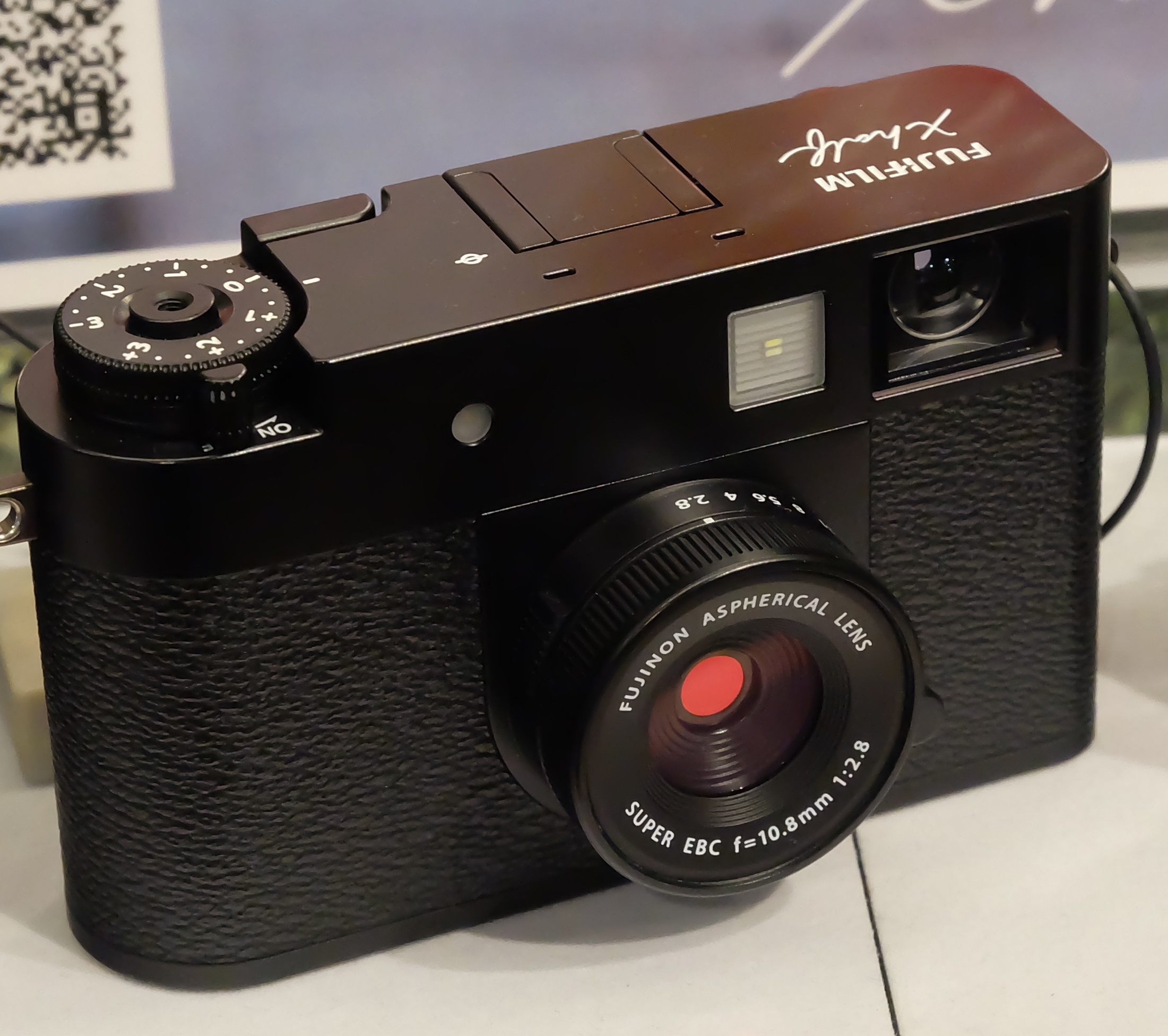

Overview
- Maker: Fujifilm
- Type: Fixed Lens Digital Camera
- Released: 26 June 2025; 12 months ago
- Intro price: ¥118,800

Lens
- Lens mount: Fixed lens
- Lens: 10.8mm 32mm(35 mm equivalent)
- F-numbers: f/2.8 - f/11
- Compatible lenses: Fujinon

Sensor/medium
- Sensor: 1inch sensor
- Sensor type: Undisclosed
- Sensor size: 13.3mm × 8.8mm vertical
- Sensor maker: Undisclosed
- Maximum resolution: 17.74megapixels 7296 x 4864
- Film speed: 200 –12800
- Storage media: SD, SDHC, SDXC, UHS-I

Focusing
- Focus: Intelligent Hybrid TTL AF contrast and phase detection
- Focus modes: Single AF, Continuous AF, Manual
- Focus bracketing: Auto, Manual

Exposure/metering
- Exposure: TTL 256-zone metering
- Exposure bracketing: -3.0EV ~ +3.0EV 1/3EV step
- Exposure modes: Program AE, Aperture Priority AE, Shutter Speed Priority AE, Manual Exposure
- Exposure metering: Through-the-lens
- Metering modes: Multi, Spot, Average, Center Weighted

Flash
- Flash: Fixed LED flash

Shutter
- Shutter: Lens Shutter
- Shutter speeds: 4 s to 1/2000 s

Viewfinder
- Viewfinder: OVF
- Optional viewfinders: yes
- Viewfinder magnification: 0.38
- Frame coverage: 90%

Image processing
- Image processor: Undisclosed
- White balance: Auto, Custom, Preset, Fluorescent, Incandescent, Underwater

General
- Video recording: MOV, MP4; Full HD up to 48 fps
- LCD screen: 2.4" 0.92M dots touchscreen
- Battery: NP-W126S Li-ion; USB rechargeable
- Data port: USB-C 2.0, Wi-Fi 5, Bluetooth 4.2
- Dimensions: 105.8 mm × 64.3 mm × 45.8 mm (4.17 in × 2.53 in × 1.80 in)
- Weight: 240 g (8 oz) (0.53 lb) including battery and memory card
- Made in: PR China

The Fujifilm X-HF1, commercial name as "X half" is a half-frame style digital camera, that announced on May 22, 2025 and shipped on June 25, 2025. As part of a project to digitally recreate a half-frame camera like the "FUJICA Half," the camera has a 1-inch sensor mounted vertically, producing vertical images by default.It is a 5-group, 6-element prime lens with a focal length of 10.8mm, which is the same focal length as QuickSnap. By using a lever that resembles a film winder, be able to operate like an old half-frame camera, such as using 2-in-1 shooting or a mode that takes all the set number of shots and then develops them. Few camera control dials for exposure compensation, aperture, and manual focus, but other settings are control touch and flick for two LCDs.

The X half won Camera Grand Prix 2026 Editor's choice R&D award.

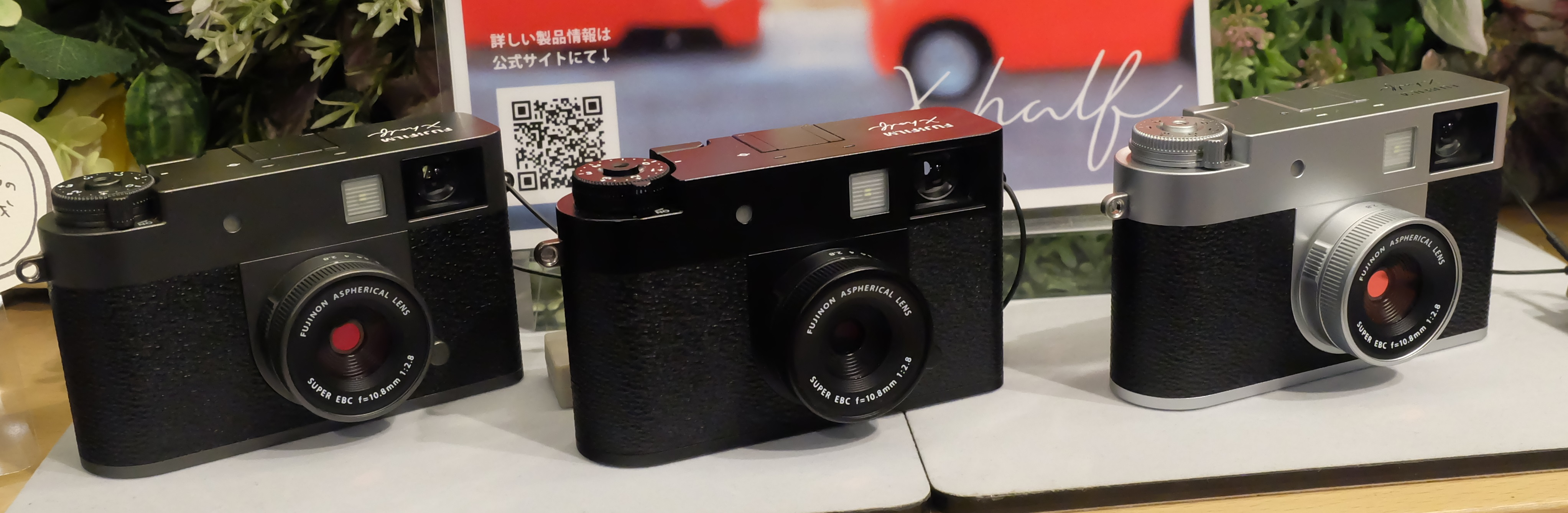

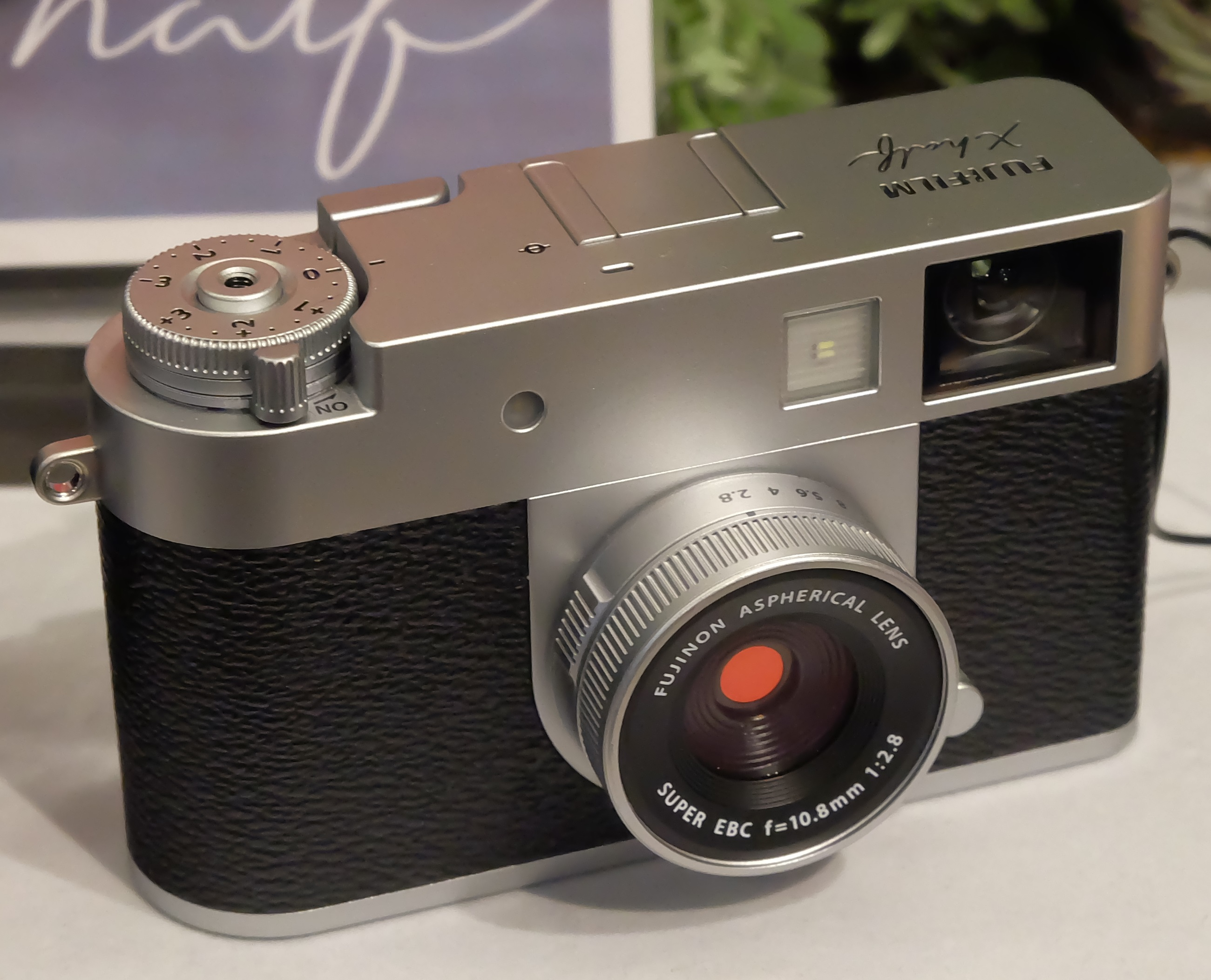

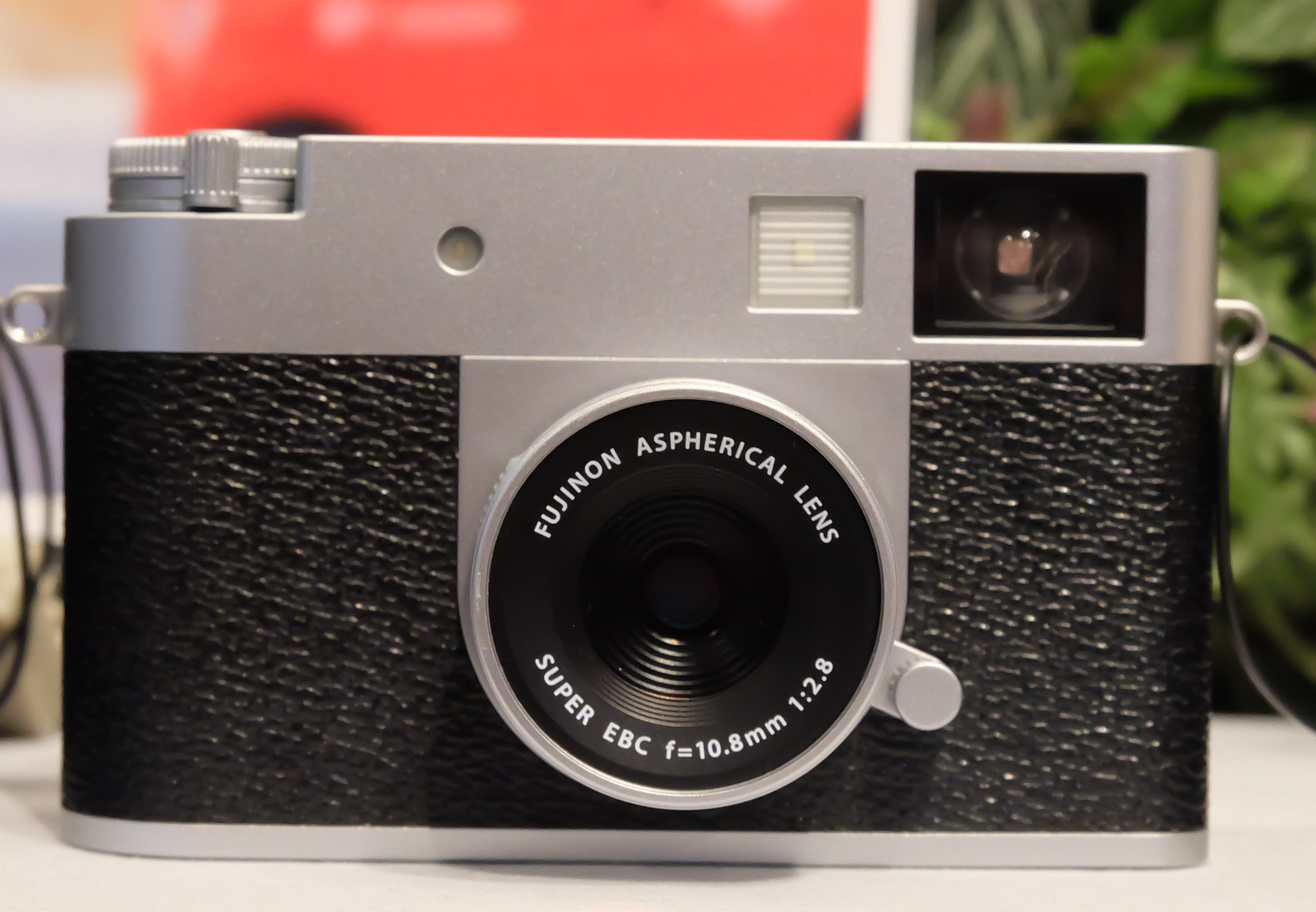

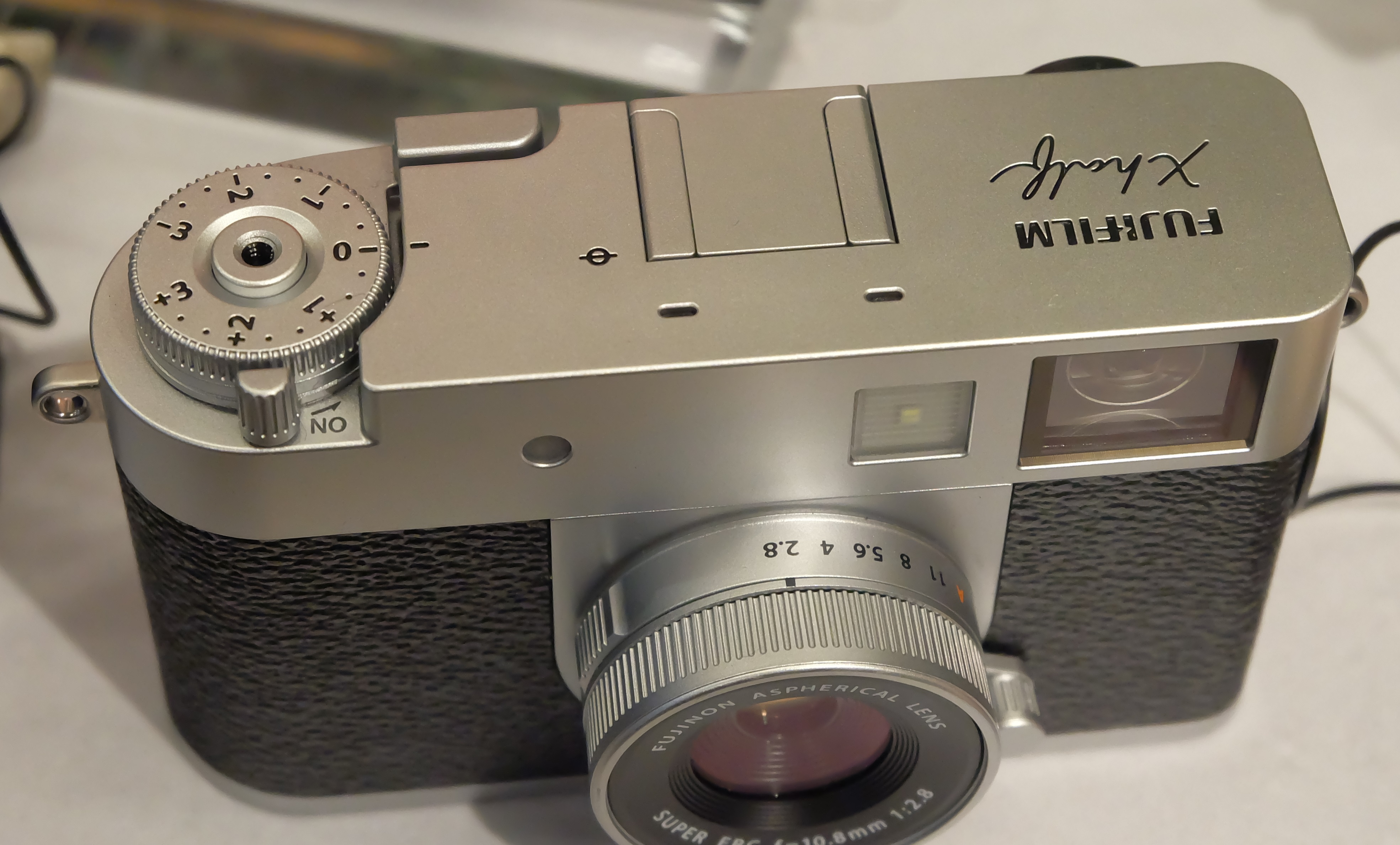

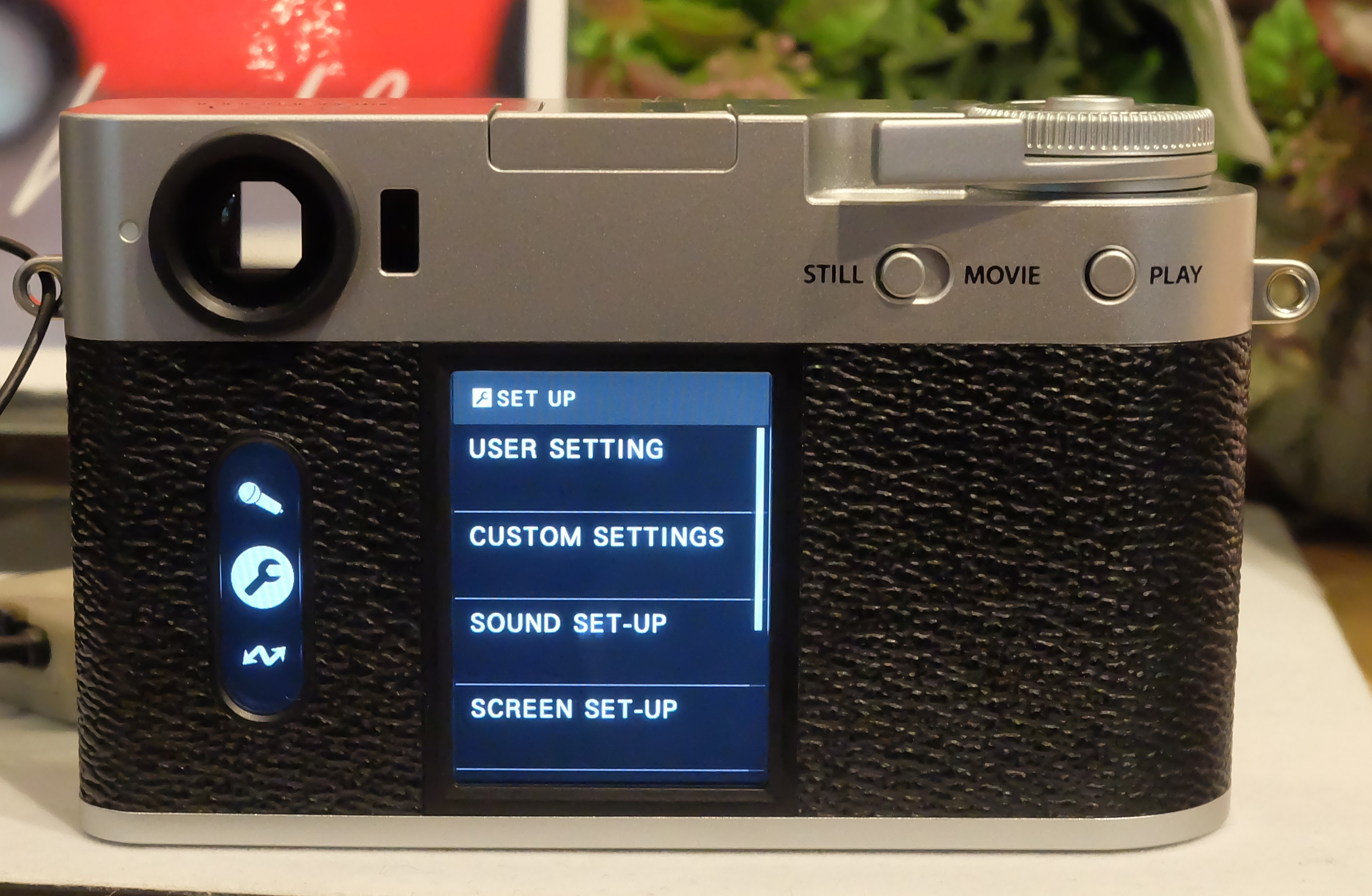

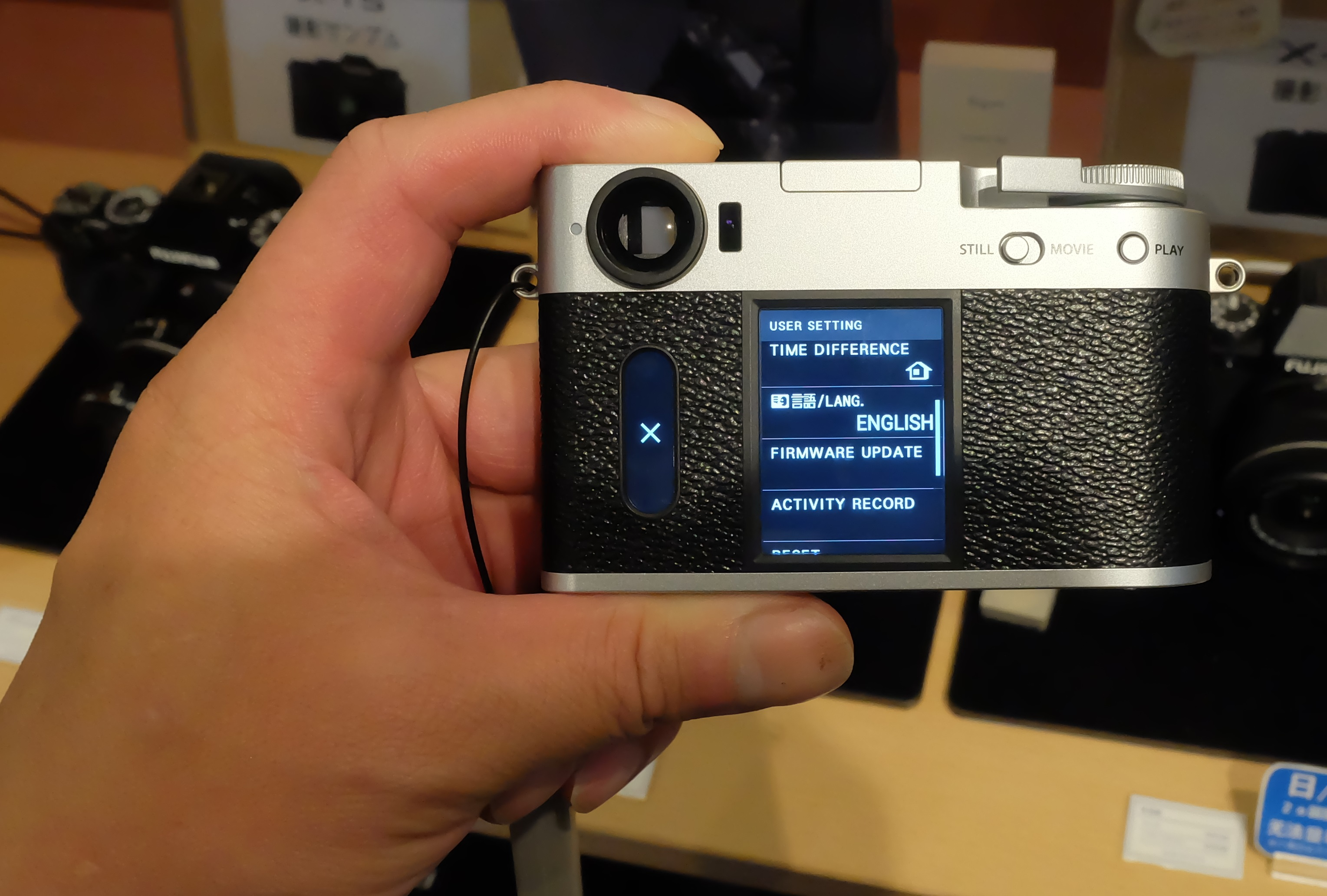

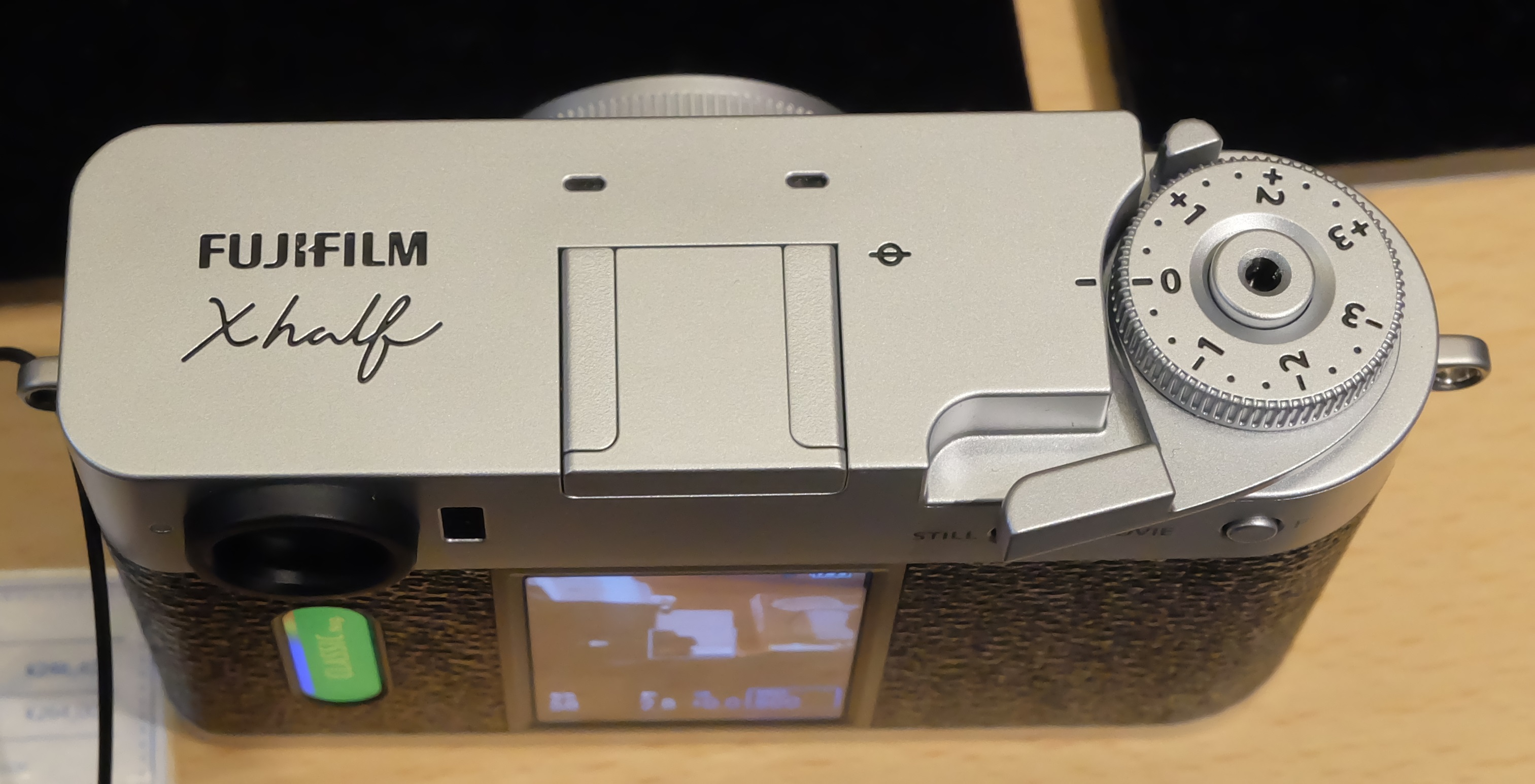

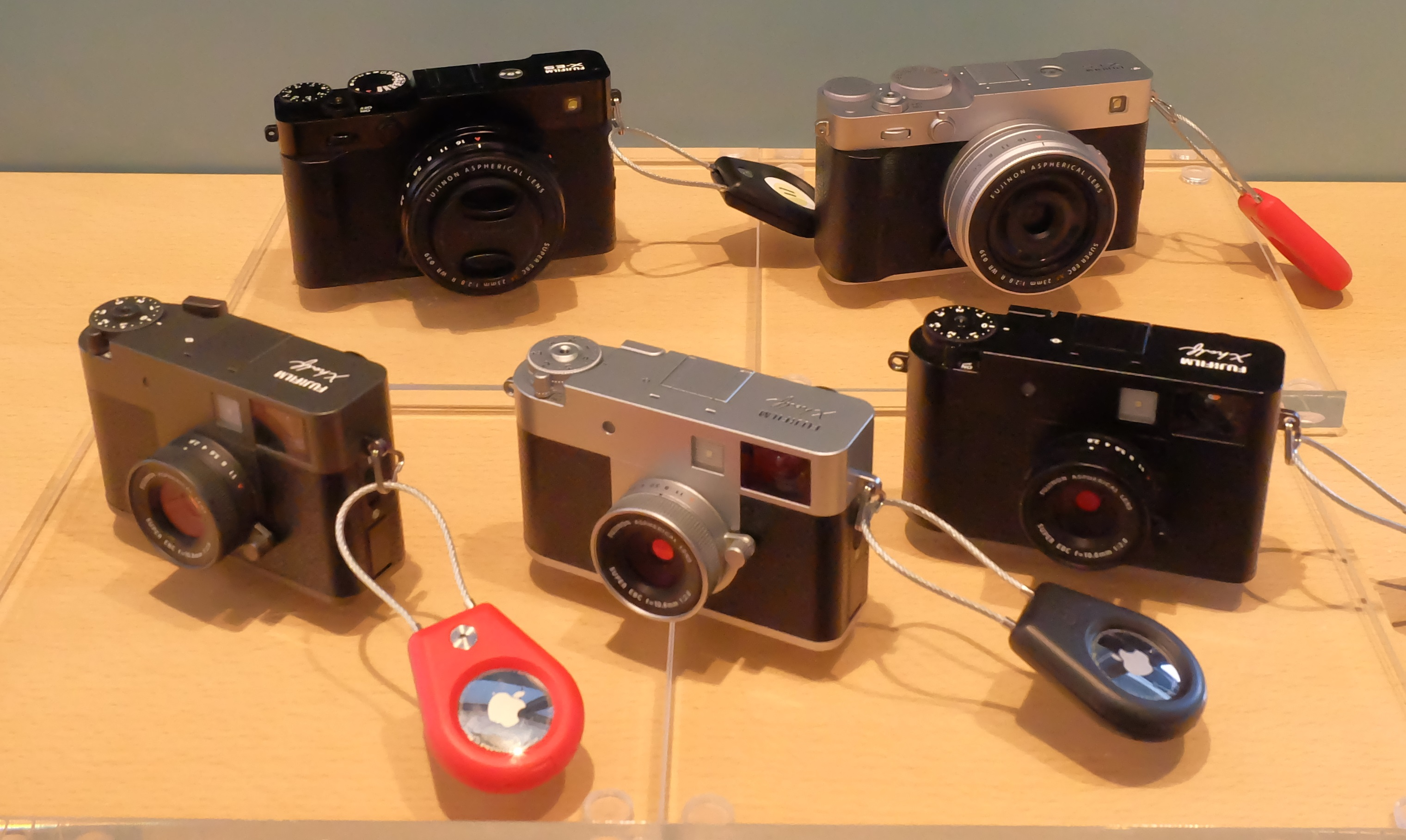

Type	Lens	2011	2012	2013	2014	2015	2016	2017	2018	2019	2020	2021	2022	2023	2024	2025	2026
MILC	G-mount; Medium format sensor							GFX 50S ^{F} ^{T}					GFX 50S II ^{F} ^{T}				
MILC	G-mount; Medium format sensor									GFX 50R ^{F} ^{T}							
MILC	G-mount; Medium format sensor										GFX 100 ^{F} ^{T}					GFX 100 II ^{F} ^{T}	
MILC	G-mount; Medium format sensor											GFX 100 IR ^{F} ^{T}					
MILC	G-mount; Medium format sensor											GFX 100S ^{F} ^{T}				GFX 100S II ^{F} ^{T}	
MILC	G-mount; Medium format sensor															GFX Eterna 55 ^{F} ^{T}	
MILC	Prime lens Medium format sensor															GFX 100RF ^{F} ^{T}	
MILC	X-mount; APS-C sensor		X-Pro1				X-Pro2				X-Pro3 ^{f} ^{T}						
MILC	X-mount; APS-C sensor								X-H1 ^{F} ^{T}					X-H2 ^{A} ^{T}			
MILC	X-mount; APS-C sensor													X-H2S ^{A} ^{T}			
MILC	X-mount; APS-C sensor											X-S10 ^{A} ^{T}			X-S20 ^{A} ^{T}		
MILC	X-mount; APS-C sensor				X-T1 ^{f}			X-T2 ^{F}		X-T3 ^{F} ^{T}		X-T4 ^{A} ^{T}		X-T5 ^{F} ^{T}			
MILC	X-mount; APS-C sensor															X-T50 ^{f} ^{T}	
MILC	X-mount; APS-C sensor						X-T10 ^{f}	X-T20 ^{f} ^{T}		X-T30 ^{f} ^{T}			X-T30 II ^{f} ^{T}			X-T30 III ^{f} ^{T}	
MILC	X-mount; APS-C sensor									_{15} X-T100 ^{F} ^{T}	X-T200 ^{A} ^{T}						
MILC	X-mount; APS-C sensor			X-E1	X-E2		X-E2s		X-E3 ^{T}			X-E4 ^{f} ^{T}				X-E5 ^{f} ^{T}	
MILC	X-mount; APS-C sensor				X-M1 ^{f}											X-M5 ^{A} ^{T}	
MILC	X-mount; APS-C sensor				X-A1 ^{f}	X-A2 ^{f}		X-A3 ^{f} ^{T}	_{15} X-A5 ^{f} ^{T}		X-A7 ^{A} ^{T}						
MILC	X-mount; APS-C sensor							X-A10 ^{f}	X-A20 ^{f} ^{T}								
Compact	Prime lens APS-C sensor	X100		X100S		X100T		X100F			X100V ^{f} ^{T}				X100VI ^{f} ^{T}		
Compact	Prime lens APS-C sensor						X70 ^{f} ^{T}			XF10 ^{T}							
Compact	Prime lens 1" sensor															X half ^{T}	
Compact	Zoom lens^{2}/_{3}" sensor		X10	X20		X30 ^{f}											
Compact	Zoom lens^{2}/_{3}" sensor				XQ1	XQ2											
Compact	Zoom lens^{2}/_{3}" sensor			XF1													
Bridge	^{2}/_{3}" sensor		X-S1 ^{f}														
Type	Lens																
Type	Lens	2011	2012	2013	2014	2015	2016	2017	2018	2019	2020	2021	2022	2023	2024	2025	2026
