= Fujifilm XQ1 =

2013 digital compact camera

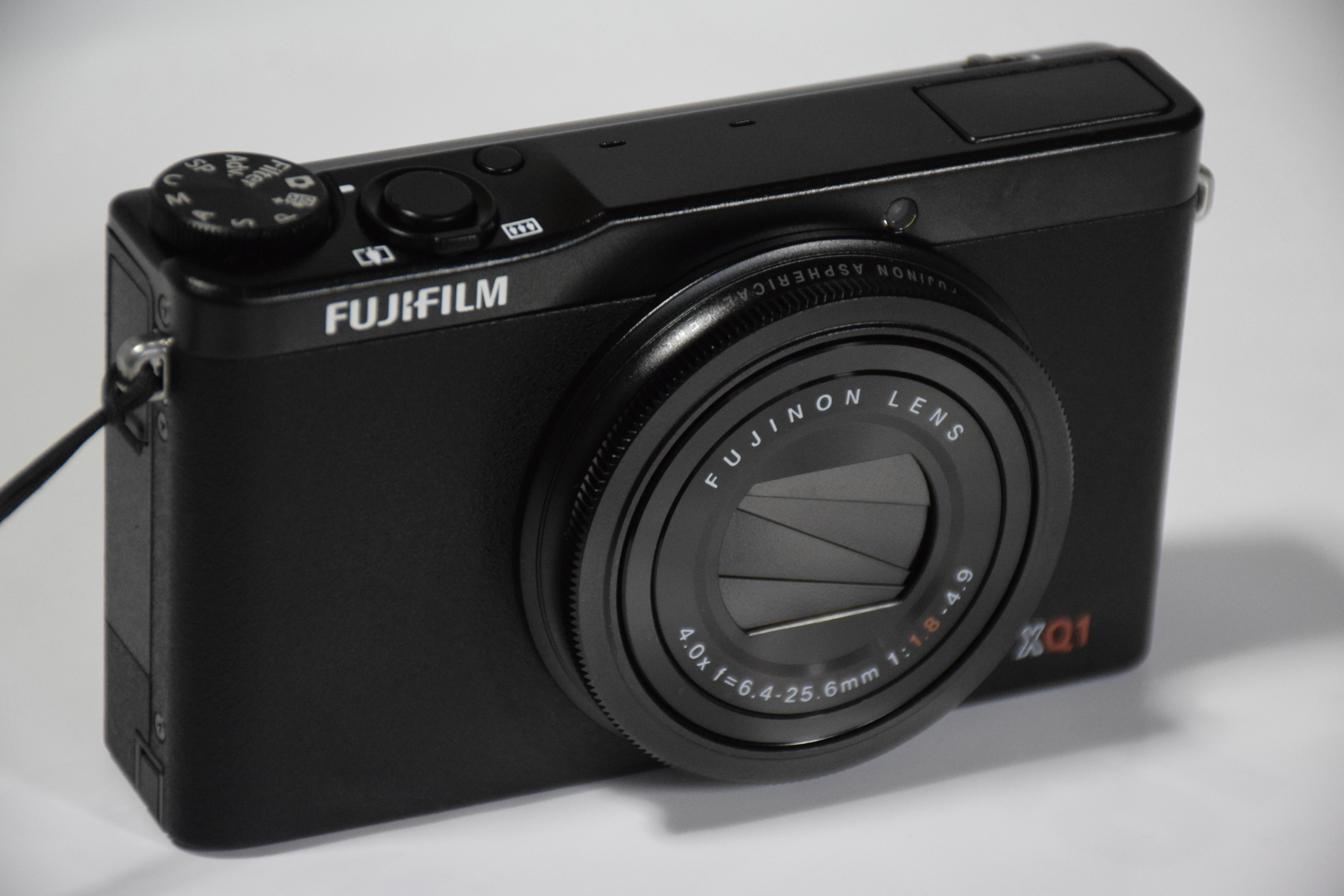

Overview
- Maker: Fujifilm

Lens
- Lens: 25-100 mm equivalent
- F-numbers: f/1.8-f/4.9 at the widest

Sensor/medium
- Sensor type: X-Trans CMOS II
- Sensor size: 8.8 x 6.6 mm (2/3 inch type)
- Maximum resolution: 4000 x 3000 (12 megapixels)
- Film speed: 100-12800
- Recording medium: SD, SDHC or SDXC memory card

Shutter
- Shutter speeds: 1/4000s to 30s
- Continuous shooting: 12 frames per second

Image processing
- White balance: Yes

General
- LCD screen: 3 inches with 920,000 dots
- Dimensions: 100 x 59 x 33 mm (3.94 x 2.32 x 1.3 inches)
- Weight: 206g including battery

The Fujifilm XQ1 is a digital compact camera announced by Fujifilm on October 18, 2013. The XQ1 is a 2014 iF product design award recipient. Its phase detection sensor gives it fast autofocus considering its class.

Type	Lens	2011	2012	2013	2014	2015	2016	2017	2018	2019	2020	2021	2022	2023	2024	2025
MILC	G-mount; Medium format sensor							GFX 50S ^{F} ^{T}					GFX 50S II ^{F} ^{T}			
MILC	G-mount; Medium format sensor									GFX 50R ^{F} ^{T}						
MILC	G-mount; Medium format sensor										GFX 100 ^{F} ^{T}					GFX 100 II ^{F} ^{T}
MILC	G-mount; Medium format sensor											GFX 100 IR ^{F} ^{T}				
MILC	G-mount; Medium format sensor											GFX 100S ^{F} ^{T}				GFX 100S II^{F} ^{T}
MILC	G-mount; Medium format sensor															GFX Eterna 55^{F} ^{T}
MILC	Prime lens Medium format sensor															GFX 100RF ^{F} ^{T}
MILC	X-mount; APS-C sensor		X-Pro1				X-Pro2				X-Pro3 ^{f} ^{T}					
MILC	X-mount; APS-C sensor								X-H1 ^{F} ^{T}					X-H2 ^{A} ^{T}		
MILC	X-mount; APS-C sensor													X-H2S ^{A} ^{T}		
MILC	X-mount; APS-C sensor											X-S10 ^{A} ^{T}			X-S20 ^{A} ^{T}	
MILC	X-mount; APS-C sensor				X-T1 ^{f}			X-T2 ^{F}		X-T3 ^{F} ^{T}		X-T4 ^{A} ^{T}		X-T5 ^{F} ^{T}		
MILC	X-mount; APS-C sensor						X-T10 ^{f}	X-T20 ^{f} ^{T}		X-T30 ^{f} ^{T}			X-T30 II ^{f} ^{T}			X-T50 ^{f} ^{T}
MILC	X-mount; APS-C sensor									_{15} X-T100 ^{F} ^{T}	X-T200 ^{A} ^{T}					
MILC	X-mount; APS-C sensor			X-E1	X-E2		X-E2s		X-E3 ^{T}			X-E4 ^{f} ^{T}				X-E5 ^{f} ^{T}
MILC	X-mount; APS-C sensor				X-M1 ^{f}											X-M5 ^{A} ^{T}
MILC	X-mount; APS-C sensor				X-A1 ^{f}	X-A2 ^{f}		X-A3 ^{f} ^{T}	_{15} X-A5 ^{f} ^{T}		X-A7 ^{A} ^{T}					
MILC	X-mount; APS-C sensor							X-A10 ^{f}	X-A20 ^{f} ^{T}							
Compact	Prime lens APS-C sensor	X100		X100S		X100T		X100F			X100V ^{f} ^{T}				X100VI ^{f} ^{T}	
Compact	Prime lens APS-C sensor						X70 ^{f} ^{T}			XF10 ^{T}						
Compact	Prime lens 1" sensor															X half ^{T}
Compact	Zoom lens^{2}/_{3}" sensor		X10	X20		X30 ^{f}										
Compact	Zoom lens^{2}/_{3}" sensor				XQ1	XQ2										
Compact	Zoom lens^{2}/_{3}" sensor			XF1												
Bridge	^{2}/_{3}" sensor		X-S1 ^{f}													
Type	Lens															
Type	Lens	2011	2012	2013	2014	2015	2016	2017	2018	2019	2020	2021	2022	2023	2024	2025
