= Fujifilm X20 =

2013 digital compact camera

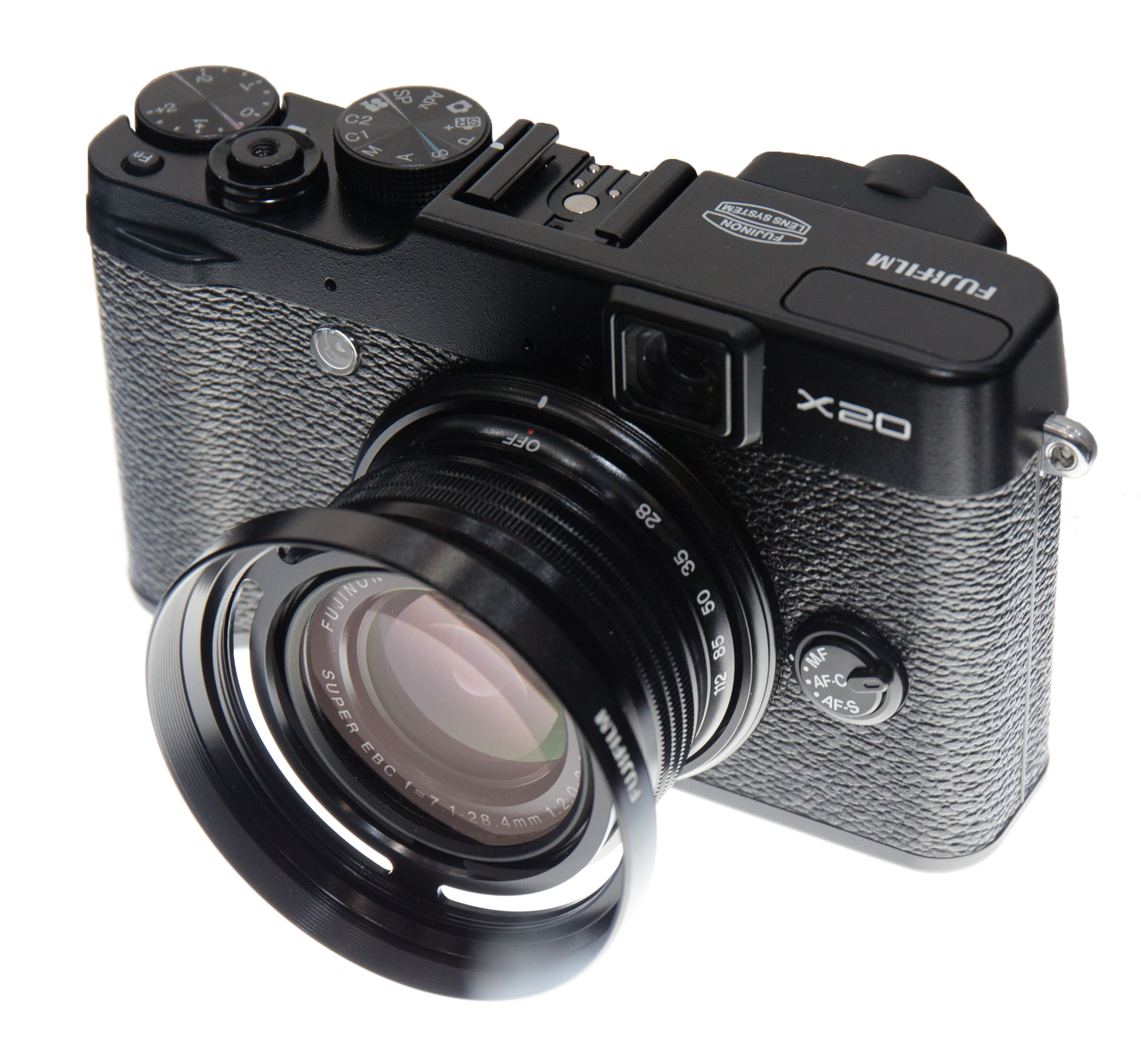

Overview
- Maker: Fujifilm

Lens
- Lens: 28-112 mm equivalent
- F-numbers: f/2.0-f/2.8 at the widest

Sensor/medium
- Sensor: X-Trans CMOS II
- Sensor type: CMOS
- Sensor size: 8.8 x 6.6 mm (2/3 inch type)
- Maximum resolution: 4000 x 3000 (12 megapixels)
- Film speed: 100-12800
- Recording medium: SD, SDHC or SDXC memory card

Shutter
- Shutter speeds: 1/4000 s to 30 s
- Continuous shooting: 12 frames per second

Viewfinder
- Frame coverage: 85%

Image processing
- Image processor: EXR Processor II
- White balance: Yes

General
- LCD screen: 2.8 inches with 460,000 dots
- Dimensions: 117 x 70 x 57 mm (4.61 x 2.76 x 2.24 inches)
- Weight: 353 g (12 oz) including battery

References
- Specifications

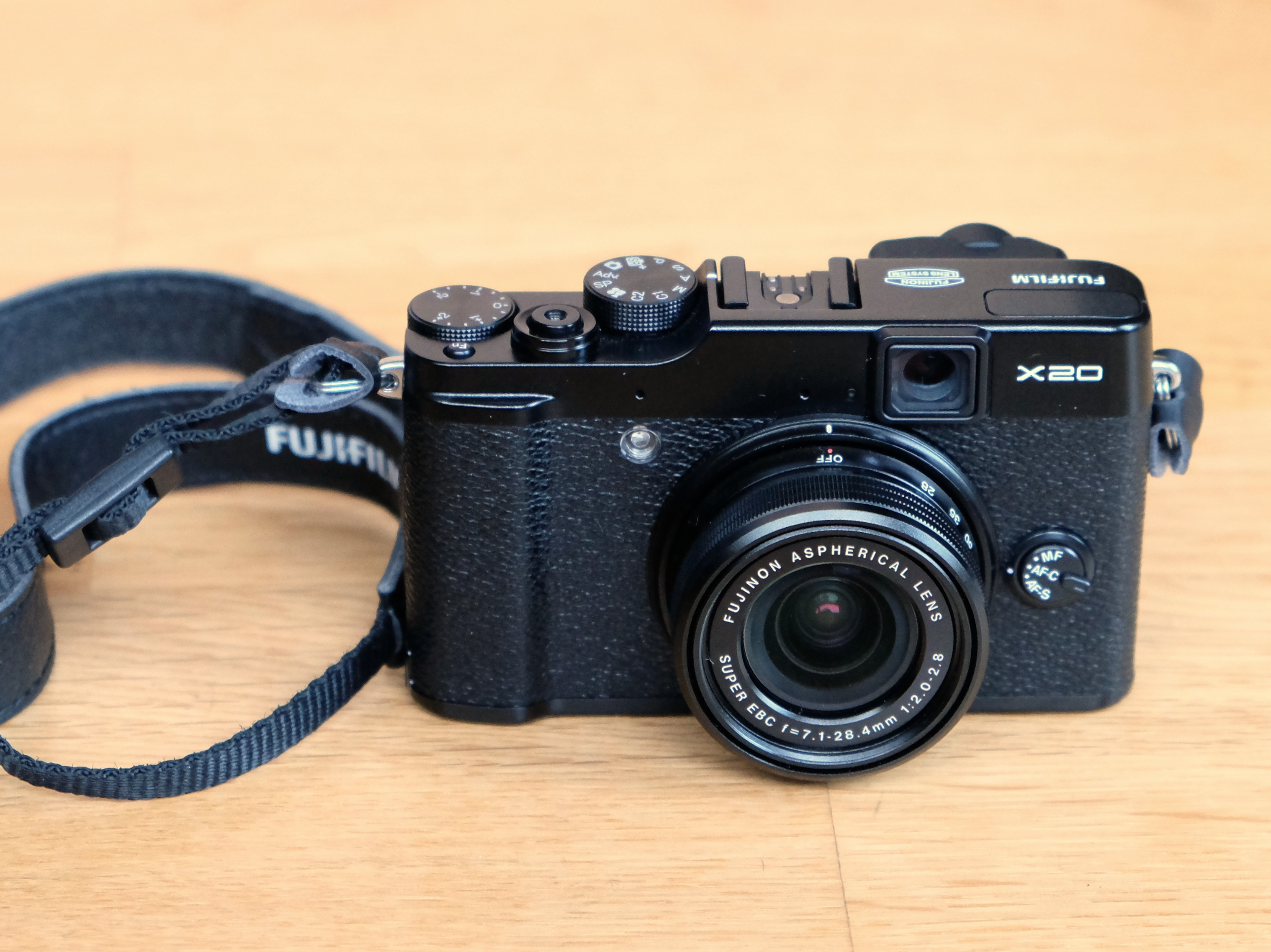
Fujifilm X20

The Fujifilm X20 is a digital compact camera announced by Fujifilm on January 7, 2013. It is the successor to the Fujifilm X10, with which it shares its lens. However, instead of an EXR colour filter pattern as in the X10, the X20 uses an X-Trans pattern on its sensor. Another advance is that the new sensor supports phase detection autofocus. Concurrently, the image processor was upgraded to version II. The viewfinder no longer is a simple tunnel viewfinder, but includes an information overlay with focus confirmation and exposure data indicated. Another new focusing feature not available in the X10 is focus peaking on the rear display.

The X20 can record video at 1080p (FullHD) resolution at 60 frames per second, twice the framerate of its predecessor. A hybrid autofocus system refocuses automatically during video capture.

The X20 comes in two colour versions, the original black of the X10, and a new black and silver body.

According to Fujifilm, the X20 has "the world's fastest autofocus speed in its class", focusing in as little as 0.06 seconds. It was superseded by the Fujifilm X30 in August 2014.

== See also ==
- List of retro-style digital cameras

Type	Lens	2011	2012	2013	2014	2015	2016	2017	2018	2019	2020	2021	2022	2023	2024	2025
MILC	G-mount; Medium format sensor							GFX 50S ^{F} ^{T}					GFX 50S II ^{F} ^{T}			
MILC	G-mount; Medium format sensor									GFX 50R ^{F} ^{T}						
MILC	G-mount; Medium format sensor										GFX 100 ^{F} ^{T}					GFX 100 II ^{F} ^{T}
MILC	G-mount; Medium format sensor											GFX 100 IR ^{F} ^{T}				
MILC	G-mount; Medium format sensor											GFX 100S ^{F} ^{T}				GFX 100S II^{F} ^{T}
MILC	G-mount; Medium format sensor															GFX Eterna 55^{F} ^{T}
MILC	Prime lens Medium format sensor															GFX 100RF ^{F} ^{T}
MILC	X-mount; APS-C sensor		X-Pro1				X-Pro2				X-Pro3 ^{f} ^{T}					
MILC	X-mount; APS-C sensor								X-H1 ^{F} ^{T}					X-H2 ^{A} ^{T}		
MILC	X-mount; APS-C sensor													X-H2S ^{A} ^{T}		
MILC	X-mount; APS-C sensor											X-S10 ^{A} ^{T}			X-S20 ^{A} ^{T}	
MILC	X-mount; APS-C sensor				X-T1 ^{f}			X-T2 ^{F}		X-T3 ^{F} ^{T}		X-T4 ^{A} ^{T}		X-T5 ^{F} ^{T}		
MILC	X-mount; APS-C sensor						X-T10 ^{f}	X-T20 ^{f} ^{T}		X-T30 ^{f} ^{T}			X-T30 II ^{f} ^{T}			X-T50 ^{f} ^{T}
MILC	X-mount; APS-C sensor									_{15} X-T100 ^{F} ^{T}	X-T200 ^{A} ^{T}					
MILC	X-mount; APS-C sensor			X-E1	X-E2		X-E2s		X-E3 ^{T}			X-E4 ^{f} ^{T}				X-E5 ^{f} ^{T}
MILC	X-mount; APS-C sensor				X-M1 ^{f}											X-M5 ^{A} ^{T}
MILC	X-mount; APS-C sensor				X-A1 ^{f}	X-A2 ^{f}		X-A3 ^{f} ^{T}	_{15} X-A5 ^{f} ^{T}		X-A7 ^{A} ^{T}					
MILC	X-mount; APS-C sensor							X-A10 ^{f}	X-A20 ^{f} ^{T}							
Compact	Prime lens APS-C sensor	X100		X100S		X100T		X100F			X100V ^{f} ^{T}				X100VI ^{f} ^{T}	
Compact	Prime lens APS-C sensor						X70 ^{f} ^{T}			XF10 ^{T}						
Compact	Prime lens 1" sensor															X half ^{T}
Compact	Zoom lens^{2}/_{3}" sensor		X10	X20		X30 ^{f}										
Compact	Zoom lens^{2}/_{3}" sensor				XQ1	XQ2										
Compact	Zoom lens^{2}/_{3}" sensor			XF1												
Bridge	^{2}/_{3}" sensor		X-S1 ^{f}													
Type	Lens															
Type	Lens	2011	2012	2013	2014	2015	2016	2017	2018	2019	2020	2021	2022	2023	2024	2025
