= Fujifilm X-S1 =

Digital camera model

Fujifilm FinePix X-S1
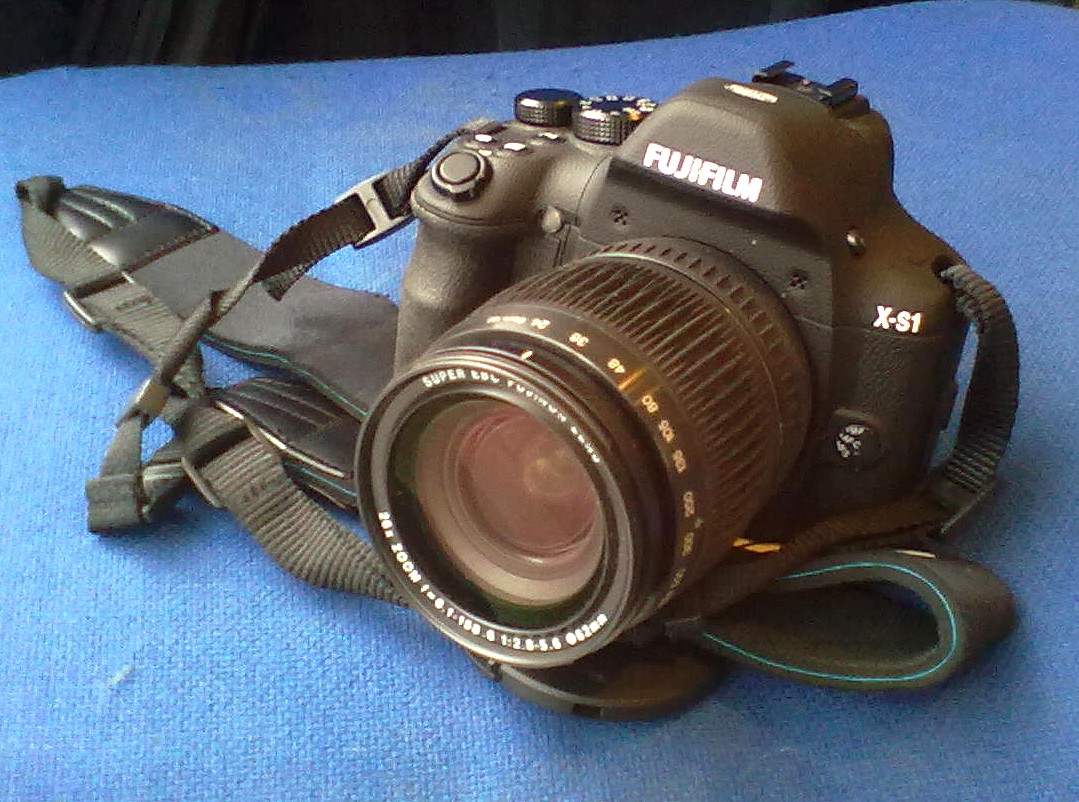
- Fujifilm X-S1

Overview
- Maker: Fujifilm
- Type: Bridge camera

Lens
- Lens: 6.1mm-158.6mm (24-624mm 35mm equivalent; 26x optical zoom) f/2.8 to f/5.6

Sensor/medium
- Sensor type: EXR color filter array CMOS
- Sensor size: 2/3" (8.8x6.6mm)
- Maximum resolution: 4000x3000 (12 megapixels)
- Film speed: ISO 100–3200 (12800 with boost)
- Storage media: Secure Digital Card; SDHC; SDXC

Focusing
- Focus: contrast detection
- Focus areas: 49 focus points

Flash
- Flash: Built-in pop up and hotshoe

Shutter
- Shutter: Manual
- Shutter speed range: 1/4000 sec up to 30 sec
- Continuous shooting: 7 frames/s for full-size JPEG (10 frames/s at 6 megapixels)

Viewfinder
- Viewfinder: EVF and 3.0 inch colour LCD (460,000 pixels)
- Image processor: EXR

General
- Dimensions: 135 (W) x 107 (H) x 149 (D) mm
- Weight: 920 g (32 oz) (2.03 lb)

The Fujifilm FinePix X-S1 is a digital superzoom bridge camera with a 12 megapixel sensor, released in November 2011, and is part of the Fujifilm X-series of higher-end cameras. With a field of view range equivalent of 24-624mm in 35mm format, it has 26 times optical zoom. Its sensor obtained a DxOMark score of 49. It bears little relation to the Fujifilm X-S10 mirrorless interchangeable-lens camera released in 2020.

== Awards ==
The X-S1 won the TIPA Best Superzoom Camera Award in 2012.

== Reception ==
Photographyblog.com said the X-S1 is a "superzoom camera that can boast similar responsiveness to a DSLR", while DigitalCameraInfo.com stated, "build quality, handling, and user experience are the best that we’ve seen in a superzoom".

== See also ==
- List of bridge cameras

Type	Lens	2011	2012	2013	2014	2015	2016	2017	2018	2019	2020	2021	2022	2023	2024	2025
MILC	G-mount; Medium format sensor							GFX 50S ^{F} ^{T}					GFX 50S II ^{F} ^{T}			
MILC	G-mount; Medium format sensor									GFX 50R ^{F} ^{T}						
MILC	G-mount; Medium format sensor										GFX 100 ^{F} ^{T}					GFX 100 II ^{F} ^{T}
MILC	G-mount; Medium format sensor											GFX 100 IR ^{F} ^{T}				
MILC	G-mount; Medium format sensor											GFX 100S ^{F} ^{T}				GFX 100S II^{F} ^{T}
MILC	G-mount; Medium format sensor															GFX Eterna 55^{F} ^{T}
MILC	Prime lens Medium format sensor															GFX 100RF ^{F} ^{T}
MILC	X-mount; APS-C sensor		X-Pro1				X-Pro2				X-Pro3 ^{f} ^{T}					
MILC	X-mount; APS-C sensor								X-H1 ^{F} ^{T}					X-H2 ^{A} ^{T}		
MILC	X-mount; APS-C sensor													X-H2S ^{A} ^{T}		
MILC	X-mount; APS-C sensor											X-S10 ^{A} ^{T}			X-S20 ^{A} ^{T}	
MILC	X-mount; APS-C sensor				X-T1 ^{f}			X-T2 ^{F}		X-T3 ^{F} ^{T}		X-T4 ^{A} ^{T}		X-T5 ^{F} ^{T}		
MILC	X-mount; APS-C sensor						X-T10 ^{f}	X-T20 ^{f} ^{T}		X-T30 ^{f} ^{T}			X-T30 II ^{f} ^{T}			X-T50 ^{f} ^{T}
MILC	X-mount; APS-C sensor									_{15} X-T100 ^{F} ^{T}	X-T200 ^{A} ^{T}					
MILC	X-mount; APS-C sensor			X-E1	X-E2		X-E2s		X-E3 ^{T}			X-E4 ^{f} ^{T}				X-E5 ^{f} ^{T}
MILC	X-mount; APS-C sensor				X-M1 ^{f}											X-M5 ^{A} ^{T}
MILC	X-mount; APS-C sensor				X-A1 ^{f}	X-A2 ^{f}		X-A3 ^{f} ^{T}	_{15} X-A5 ^{f} ^{T}		X-A7 ^{A} ^{T}					
MILC	X-mount; APS-C sensor							X-A10 ^{f}	X-A20 ^{f} ^{T}							
Compact	Prime lens APS-C sensor	X100		X100S		X100T		X100F			X100V ^{f} ^{T}				X100VI ^{f} ^{T}	
Compact	Prime lens APS-C sensor						X70 ^{f} ^{T}			XF10 ^{T}						
Compact	Prime lens 1" sensor															X half ^{T}
Compact	Zoom lens^{2}/_{3}" sensor		X10	X20		X30 ^{f}										
Compact	Zoom lens^{2}/_{3}" sensor				XQ1	XQ2										
Compact	Zoom lens^{2}/_{3}" sensor			XF1												
Bridge	^{2}/_{3}" sensor		X-S1 ^{f}													
Type	Lens															
Type	Lens	2011	2012	2013	2014	2015	2016	2017	2018	2019	2020	2021	2022	2023	2024	2025
