= Fujifilm X30 =

2014 digital compact camera

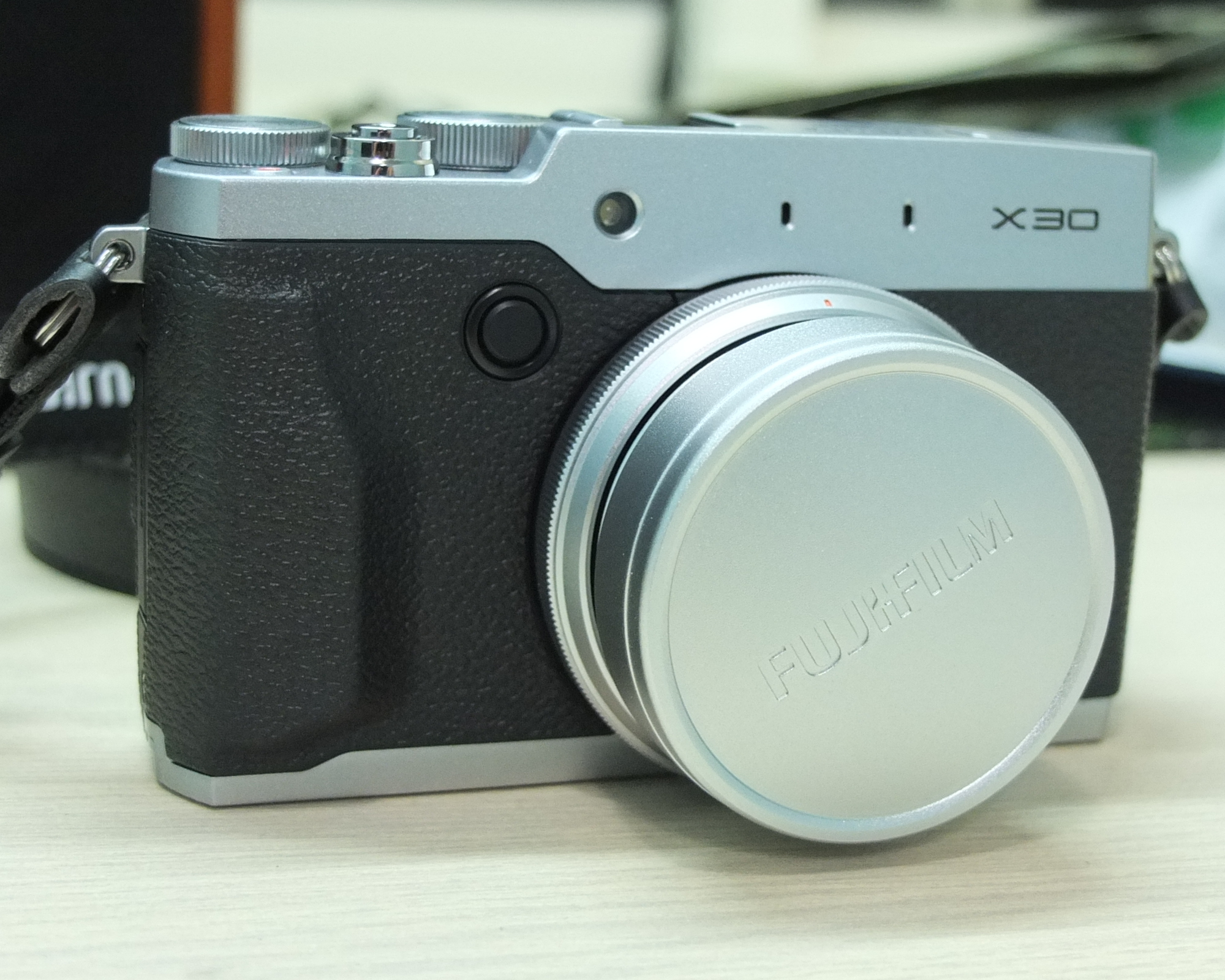

Overview
- Maker: Fujifilm

Lens
- Lens: 28-112mm equivalent
- F-numbers: f/2.0-f/2.8 at the widest

Sensor/medium
- Sensor type: X-Trans CMOS II
- Sensor size: 8.8 x 6.6mm (2/3 inch type)
- Maximum resolution: 4000 x 3000 (12 megapixels)
- Film speed: 100 to 12800
- Recording medium: SD, SDHC or SDXC memory card

Focusing
- Focus areas: 49 focus points

Shutter
- Shutter speeds: 1/4000s to 30s
- Continuous shooting: 12 frames per second

Viewfinder
- Viewfinder magnification: 0.65
- Frame coverage: 100%

Image processing
- Image processor: EXR Processor II
- White balance: Yes

General
- LCD screen: 3 inches with 920,000 dots, tilts upwards 90 degrees, downwards 45 degrees
- Dimensions: 119 x 72 x 60mm (4.69 x 2.83 x 2.36 inches)
- Weight: 423 g (15 oz) including battery

The Fujifilm X30 was a digital compact camera introduced by Fujifilm on August 26, 2014.It succeeded the Fujifilm X20 whose 12 megapixel X-Trans CMOS sensor it shared. The X30 replaced the tunnel optical viewfinder of the X20 with an electronic viewfinder. In the realm of advanced compact cameras, it was ranked between the Canon PowerShot G16 and Nikon Coolpix P7, and the Sony RX100 and Canon PowerShot G1 X series.

In terms of Fujifilm's own product line, it was seen as a more compact and affordable model than the Fujifilm X100S, which had a larger APS-C sized sensor that recorded 16 megapixels. The X30 was the last model of its kind.

== See also ==
- List of retro-style digital cameras

Type	Lens	2011	2012	2013	2014	2015	2016	2017	2018	2019	2020	2021	2022	2023	2024	2025	2026
MILC	G-mount; Medium format sensor							GFX 50S ^{F} ^{T}					GFX 50S II ^{F} ^{T}				
MILC	G-mount; Medium format sensor									GFX 50R ^{F} ^{T}							
MILC	G-mount; Medium format sensor										GFX 100 ^{F} ^{T}					GFX 100 II ^{F} ^{T}	
MILC	G-mount; Medium format sensor											GFX 100 IR ^{F} ^{T}					
MILC	G-mount; Medium format sensor											GFX 100S ^{F} ^{T}				GFX 100S II ^{F} ^{T}	
MILC	G-mount; Medium format sensor															GFX Eterna 55 ^{F} ^{T}	
MILC	Prime lens Medium format sensor															GFX 100RF ^{F} ^{T}	
MILC	X-mount; APS-C sensor		X-Pro1				X-Pro2				X-Pro3 ^{f} ^{T}						
MILC	X-mount; APS-C sensor								X-H1 ^{F} ^{T}					X-H2 ^{A} ^{T}			
MILC	X-mount; APS-C sensor													X-H2S ^{A} ^{T}			
MILC	X-mount; APS-C sensor											X-S10 ^{A} ^{T}			X-S20 ^{A} ^{T}		
MILC	X-mount; APS-C sensor				X-T1 ^{f}			X-T2 ^{F}		X-T3 ^{F} ^{T}		X-T4 ^{A} ^{T}		X-T5 ^{F} ^{T}			
MILC	X-mount; APS-C sensor															X-T50 ^{f} ^{T}	
MILC	X-mount; APS-C sensor						X-T10 ^{f}	X-T20 ^{f} ^{T}		X-T30 ^{f} ^{T}			X-T30 II ^{f} ^{T}			X-T30 III ^{f} ^{T}	
MILC	X-mount; APS-C sensor									_{15} X-T100 ^{F} ^{T}	X-T200 ^{A} ^{T}						
MILC	X-mount; APS-C sensor			X-E1	X-E2		X-E2s		X-E3 ^{T}			X-E4 ^{f} ^{T}				X-E5 ^{f} ^{T}	
MILC	X-mount; APS-C sensor				X-M1 ^{f}											X-M5 ^{A} ^{T}	
MILC	X-mount; APS-C sensor				X-A1 ^{f}	X-A2 ^{f}		X-A3 ^{f} ^{T}	_{15} X-A5 ^{f} ^{T}		X-A7 ^{A} ^{T}						
MILC	X-mount; APS-C sensor							X-A10 ^{f}	X-A20 ^{f} ^{T}								
Compact	Prime lens APS-C sensor	X100		X100S		X100T		X100F			X100V ^{f} ^{T}				X100VI ^{f} ^{T}		
Compact	Prime lens APS-C sensor						X70 ^{f} ^{T}			XF10 ^{T}							
Compact	Prime lens 1" sensor															X half ^{T}	
Compact	Zoom lens^{2}/_{3}" sensor		X10	X20		X30 ^{f}											
Compact	Zoom lens^{2}/_{3}" sensor				XQ1	XQ2											
Compact	Zoom lens^{2}/_{3}" sensor			XF1													
Bridge	^{2}/_{3}" sensor		X-S1 ^{f}														
Type	Lens																
Type	Lens	2011	2012	2013	2014	2015	2016	2017	2018	2019	2020	2021	2022	2023	2024	2025	2026
