= Fujifilm XQ2 =

2015 digital compact camera

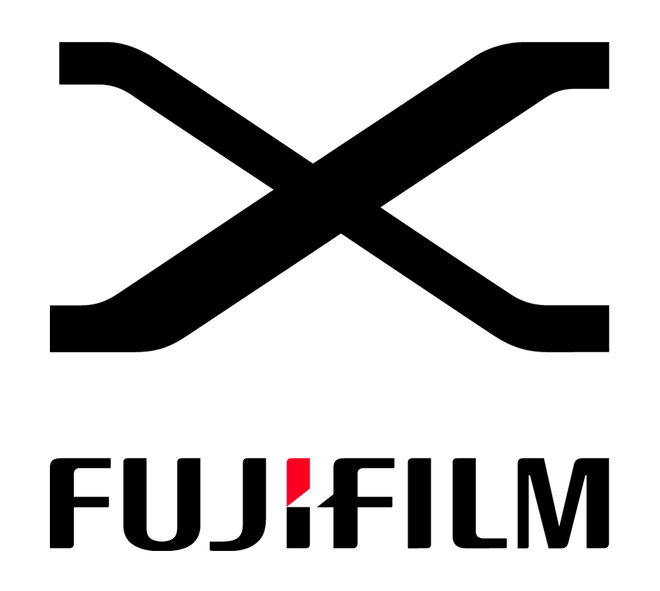

Overview
- Maker: Fujifilm

Lens
- Lens: 25-100mm equivalent
- F-numbers: f/1.8-f/4.9 at the widest

Sensor/medium
- Sensor type: X-Trans CMOS II
- Sensor size: 8.8 x 6.6mm (2/3 inch type)
- Maximum resolution: 4000 x 3000 (12 megapixels)
- Recording medium: SD, SDHC or SDXC card; internal memory

Shutter
- Shutter speeds: 1/4000s to 30s
- Continuous shooting: 12 frames per second

Image processing
- Image processor: EXR Processor II
- White balance: Yes

General
- LCD screen: 3 inches with 920,000 dots
- Dimensions: 100 x 59 x 33mm (3.94 x 2.32 x 1.3 inches)
- Weight: 206g including battery

The Fujifilm XQ2 is a digital ultracompact camera announced by Fujifilm on January 15, 2015. It distinguishes itself from the predecessor XQ1 with the addition of a Classic Chrome film simulation mode.

Type	Lens	2011	2012	2013	2014	2015	2016	2017	2018	2019	2020	2021	2022	2023	2024	2025
MILC	G-mount; Medium format sensor							GFX 50S ^{F} ^{T}					GFX 50S II ^{F} ^{T}			
MILC	G-mount; Medium format sensor									GFX 50R ^{F} ^{T}						
MILC	G-mount; Medium format sensor										GFX 100 ^{F} ^{T}					GFX 100 II ^{F} ^{T}
MILC	G-mount; Medium format sensor											GFX 100 IR ^{F} ^{T}				
MILC	G-mount; Medium format sensor											GFX 100S ^{F} ^{T}				GFX 100S II^{F} ^{T}
MILC	G-mount; Medium format sensor															GFX Eterna 55^{F} ^{T}
MILC	Prime lens Medium format sensor															GFX 100RF ^{F} ^{T}
MILC	X-mount; APS-C sensor		X-Pro1				X-Pro2				X-Pro3 ^{f} ^{T}					
MILC	X-mount; APS-C sensor								X-H1 ^{F} ^{T}					X-H2 ^{A} ^{T}		
MILC	X-mount; APS-C sensor													X-H2S ^{A} ^{T}		
MILC	X-mount; APS-C sensor											X-S10 ^{A} ^{T}			X-S20 ^{A} ^{T}	
MILC	X-mount; APS-C sensor				X-T1 ^{f}			X-T2 ^{F}		X-T3 ^{F} ^{T}		X-T4 ^{A} ^{T}		X-T5 ^{F} ^{T}		
MILC	X-mount; APS-C sensor						X-T10 ^{f}	X-T20 ^{f} ^{T}		X-T30 ^{f} ^{T}			X-T30 II ^{f} ^{T}			X-T50 ^{f} ^{T}
MILC	X-mount; APS-C sensor									_{15} X-T100 ^{F} ^{T}	X-T200 ^{A} ^{T}					
MILC	X-mount; APS-C sensor			X-E1	X-E2		X-E2s		X-E3 ^{T}			X-E4 ^{f} ^{T}				X-E5 ^{f} ^{T}
MILC	X-mount; APS-C sensor				X-M1 ^{f}											X-M5 ^{A} ^{T}
MILC	X-mount; APS-C sensor				X-A1 ^{f}	X-A2 ^{f}		X-A3 ^{f} ^{T}	_{15} X-A5 ^{f} ^{T}		X-A7 ^{A} ^{T}					
MILC	X-mount; APS-C sensor							X-A10 ^{f}	X-A20 ^{f} ^{T}							
Compact	Prime lens APS-C sensor	X100		X100S		X100T		X100F			X100V ^{f} ^{T}				X100VI ^{f} ^{T}	
Compact	Prime lens APS-C sensor						X70 ^{f} ^{T}			XF10 ^{T}						
Compact	Prime lens 1" sensor															X half ^{T}
Compact	Zoom lens^{2}/_{3}" sensor		X10	X20		X30 ^{f}										
Compact	Zoom lens^{2}/_{3}" sensor				XQ1	XQ2										
Compact	Zoom lens^{2}/_{3}" sensor			XF1												
Bridge	^{2}/_{3}" sensor		X-S1 ^{f}													
Type	Lens															
Type	Lens	2011	2012	2013	2014	2015	2016	2017	2018	2019	2020	2021	2022	2023	2024	2025
