= Fujifilm X-A2 =

FUJIFILM X-A2
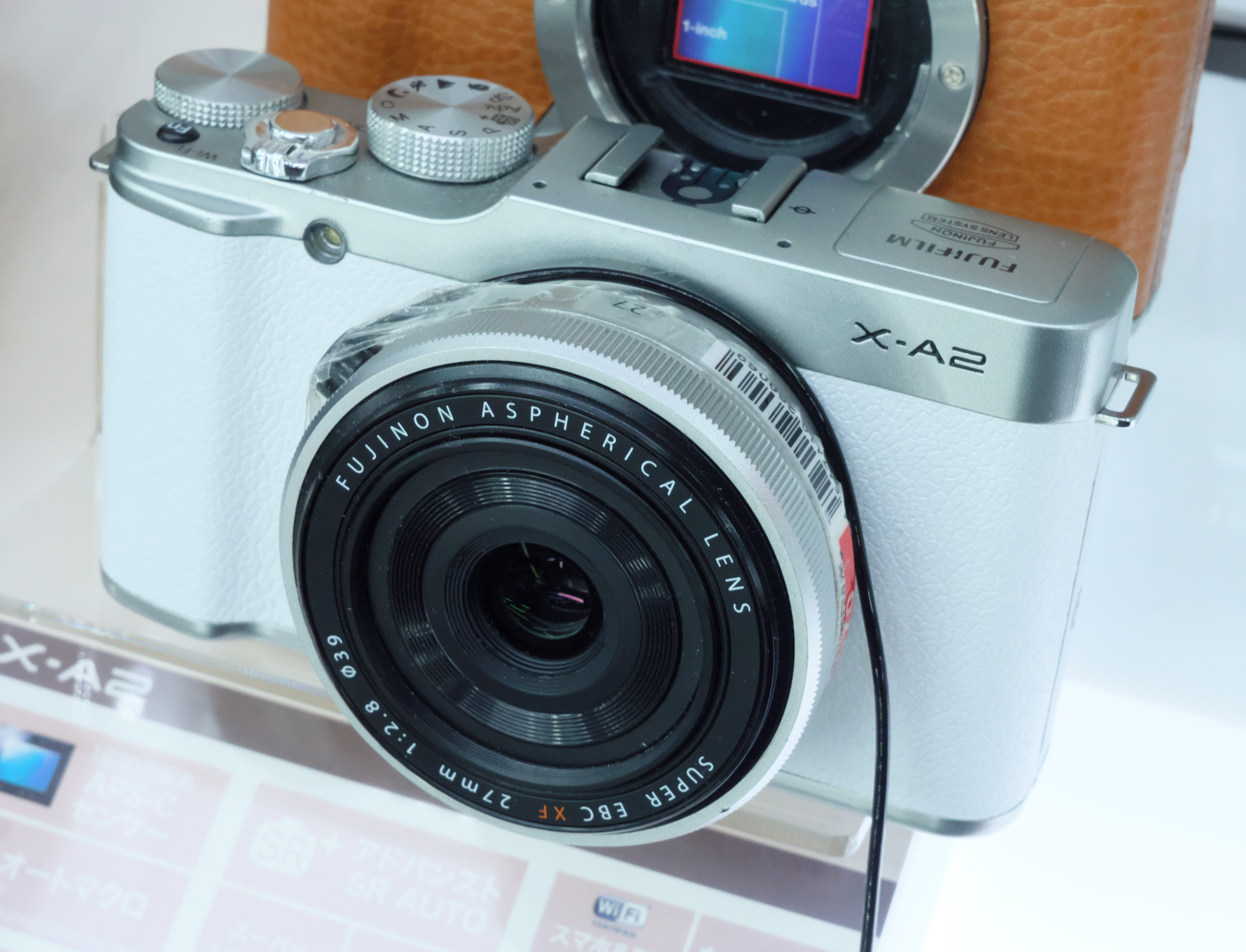
- FUJIFILM X-A2 + XF27mm F2.8

Overview
- Maker: Fujifilm

Lens
- Lens mount: Fujifilm X-mount

Sensor/medium
- Sensor type: CMOS
- Sensor size: 23.6 x 15.6mm (APS-C type)
- Maximum resolution: 4896 x 3264 (16 megapixels)
- Recording medium: SD, SDHC or SDXC card

Focusing
- Focus areas: 49 focus points

Shutter
- Shutter speeds: 1/4000s to 30s
- Continuous shooting: 5.6 frames per second

Image processing
- Image processor: EXR Processor II
- White balance: Yes

General
- LCD screen: 3 inches with 920,000 dots
- Dimensions: 117 x 67 x 40mm (4.61 x 2.64 x 1.57 inches)
- Weight: 350 g (12 oz) including battery

The Fujifilm X-A2 is a rangefinder-styled digital mirrorless camera announced by Fujifilm on January 15, 2015, and released in the UK on March 1, 2015.

== Features ==
The Fujifilm X-A2 is the first X-mount camera with a 175° LCD screen. It is aimed at the growing selfie market, with new face detection and eye detection autofocus modes, for sharper results when taking Self portraits. It was also one of the first of the X-mount line up to have the new Chrome film simulation as a preset

The Fujifilm X-A2 sports a regular Bayer filter sensor array, as opposed to the X-Trans sensor that is typical among the X-mount camera system.

The camera was designed in such a way that it could be used one handed, so all of the most used settings are within reach when using the camera in selfie mode.

== Key Features ==
- 16.3 Megapixels
- 23.6 x 16.6mm CMOS sensor (APS-C)
- TTL 256-zone metering, Multi / Spot / Average
- Face detection
- Eye detection
- 1080p HD video
- WiFi connectivity

== Reception ==
The Fujifilm X-A2 sold very well in the Asian markets, more so than in most Western countries, however this remains a popular camera among the younger generation.

== See also ==
- List of retro-style digital cameras

Type	Lens	2011	2012	2013	2014	2015	2016	2017	2018	2019	2020	2021	2022	2023	2024	2025
MILC	G-mount; Medium format sensor							GFX 50S ^{F} ^{T}					GFX 50S II ^{F} ^{T}			
MILC	G-mount; Medium format sensor									GFX 50R ^{F} ^{T}						
MILC	G-mount; Medium format sensor										GFX 100 ^{F} ^{T}					GFX 100 II ^{F} ^{T}
MILC	G-mount; Medium format sensor											GFX 100 IR ^{F} ^{T}				
MILC	G-mount; Medium format sensor											GFX 100S ^{F} ^{T}				GFX 100S II^{F} ^{T}
MILC	G-mount; Medium format sensor															GFX Eterna 55^{F} ^{T}
MILC	Prime lens Medium format sensor															GFX 100RF ^{F} ^{T}
MILC	X-mount; APS-C sensor		X-Pro1				X-Pro2				X-Pro3 ^{f} ^{T}					
MILC	X-mount; APS-C sensor								X-H1 ^{F} ^{T}					X-H2 ^{A} ^{T}		
MILC	X-mount; APS-C sensor													X-H2S ^{A} ^{T}		
MILC	X-mount; APS-C sensor											X-S10 ^{A} ^{T}			X-S20 ^{A} ^{T}	
MILC	X-mount; APS-C sensor				X-T1 ^{f}			X-T2 ^{F}		X-T3 ^{F} ^{T}		X-T4 ^{A} ^{T}		X-T5 ^{F} ^{T}		
MILC	X-mount; APS-C sensor						X-T10 ^{f}	X-T20 ^{f} ^{T}		X-T30 ^{f} ^{T}			X-T30 II ^{f} ^{T}			X-T50 ^{f} ^{T}
MILC	X-mount; APS-C sensor									_{15} X-T100 ^{F} ^{T}	X-T200 ^{A} ^{T}					
MILC	X-mount; APS-C sensor			X-E1	X-E2		X-E2s		X-E3 ^{T}			X-E4 ^{f} ^{T}				X-E5 ^{f} ^{T}
MILC	X-mount; APS-C sensor				X-M1 ^{f}											X-M5 ^{A} ^{T}
MILC	X-mount; APS-C sensor				X-A1 ^{f}	X-A2 ^{f}		X-A3 ^{f} ^{T}	_{15} X-A5 ^{f} ^{T}		X-A7 ^{A} ^{T}					
MILC	X-mount; APS-C sensor							X-A10 ^{f}	X-A20 ^{f} ^{T}							
Compact	Prime lens APS-C sensor	X100		X100S		X100T		X100F			X100V ^{f} ^{T}				X100VI ^{f} ^{T}	
Compact	Prime lens APS-C sensor						X70 ^{f} ^{T}			XF10 ^{T}						
Compact	Prime lens 1" sensor															X half ^{T}
Compact	Zoom lens^{2}/_{3}" sensor		X10	X20		X30 ^{f}										
Compact	Zoom lens^{2}/_{3}" sensor				XQ1	XQ2										
Compact	Zoom lens^{2}/_{3}" sensor			XF1												
Bridge	^{2}/_{3}" sensor		X-S1 ^{f}													
Type	Lens															
Type	Lens	2011	2012	2013	2014	2015	2016	2017	2018	2019	2020	2021	2022	2023	2024	2025
