= Fujinon XF 60mm f/2.4 R Macro =

Fujifilm XF 60mm F2.4 R Macro
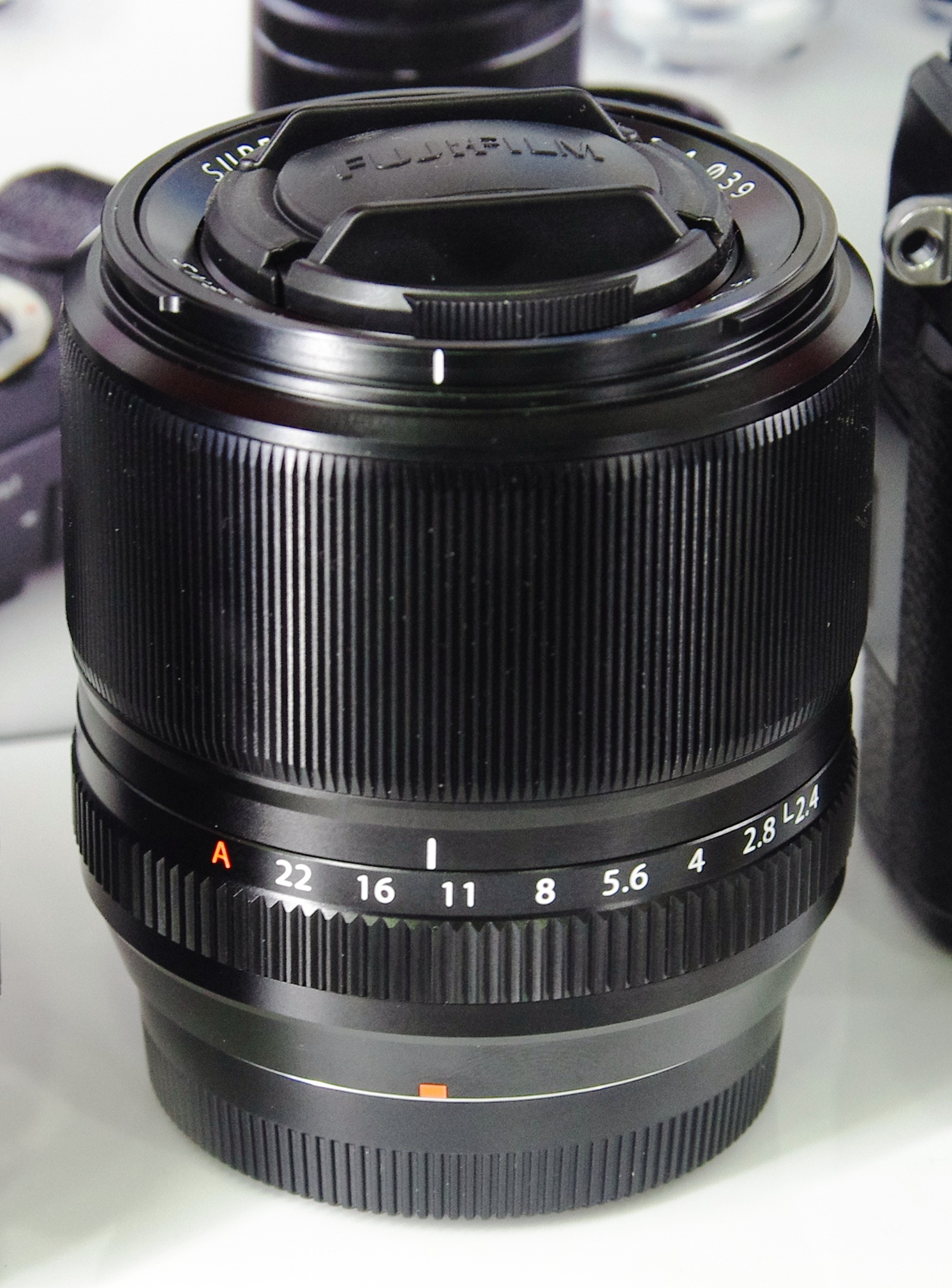
- Maker: Fujifilm
- Lens mount: Fujifilm X

Technical data
- Type: Prime
- Focal length: 60mm
- Aperture (max/min): f/2.4
- Close focus distance: 0.26 metres (0.85 ft)
- Max. magnification: 0.5
- Diaphragm blades: 9, rounded
- Construction: 10 elements in 8 groups

Features
- Weather-sealing: No No
- Lens-based stabilization: No No
- Aperture ring: Yes Yes
- Application: Close-up

Physical
- Max. length: 71 millimetres (2.8 in)
- Diameter: 64 millimetres (2.5 in)
- Weight: 215 grams (0.474 lb)

History
- Introduction: 2012

The Fujinon XF 60mm F2.4 R Macro is an interchangeable camera lens announced by Fujifilm on January 9, 2012. It is not a true macro lens, with magnification up to 1:2 rather than 1:1. As of July 2015, it is the only lens marketed for close-up work among Fujifilm's X mount offerings. However, Zeiss offers the Touit Makro-Planar T* 50mm f/2.8, which offers 1:1 magnification.
