= Zeiss Touit 1.8/32 =

Interchangeable camera lens

- Maker: Zeiss
- Lens mount(s): Fujifilm X-mount, Sony E-mount

Technical data
- Type: Prime
- Focal length: 32mm
- Image format: APS-C
- Aperture (max/min): f/1.8
- Close focus distance: 0.30 metres (0.98 ft)
- Max. magnification: 0.11
- Construction: 8 elements in 5 groups

Features
- Manual focus override: Yes Yes
- Weather-sealing: No No
- Lens-based stabilization: No No
- Aperture ring: Only in X-mount

Physical
- Max. length: 60 millimetres (2.4 in)
- Diameter: 65 millimetres (2.6 in)
- Weight: 210 grams (0.46 lb)
- Filter diameter: 52mm

History
- Introduction: 2012

The Zeiss Touit 1.8/32 is an interchangeable camera lens announced by Zeiss on September 18, 2012.
