= Fujinon XF 35mm F2 R WR =

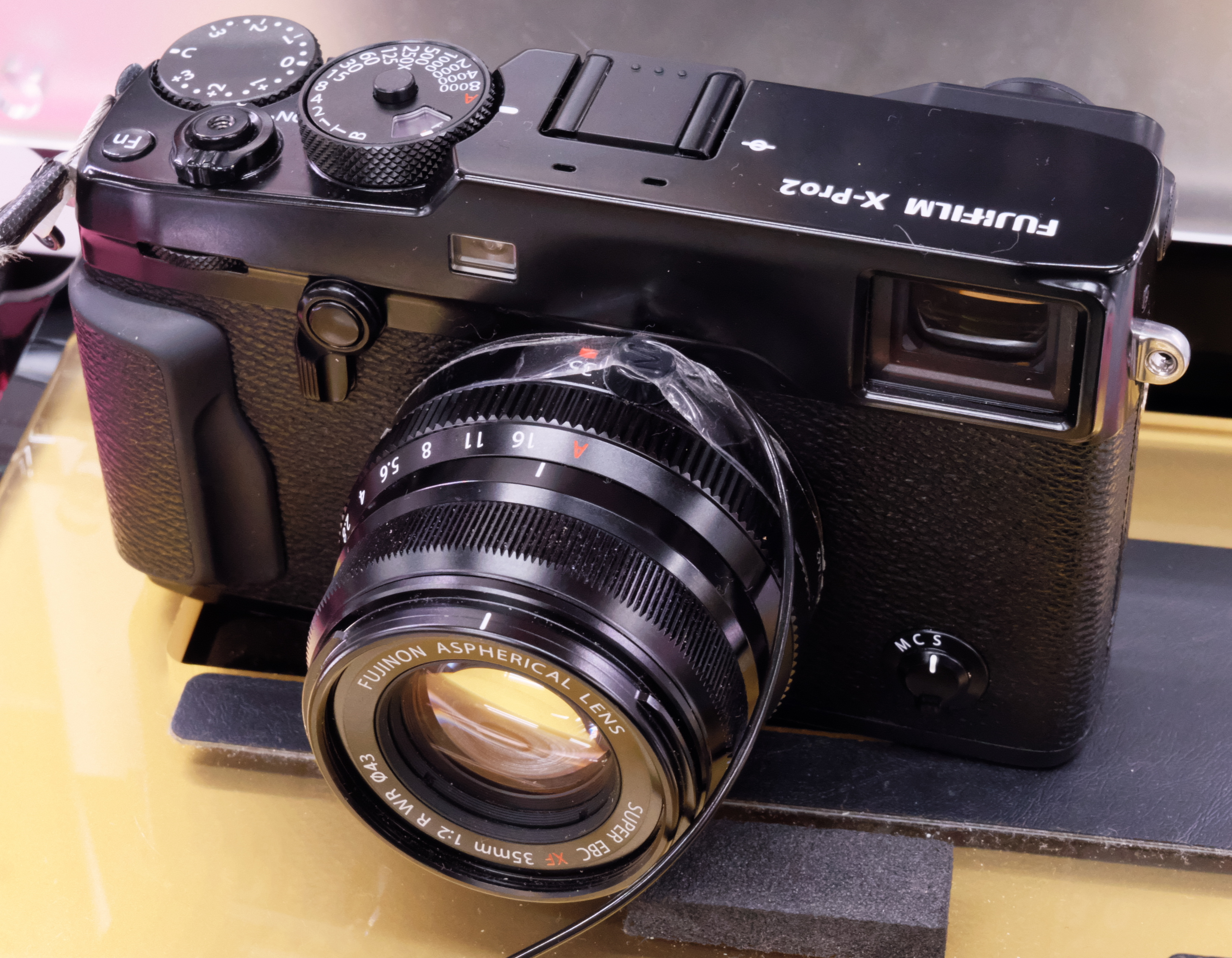
- XF 35mm F2 R WR on an X-Pro2
- Maker: Fujifilm
- Lens mount(s): Fujifilm X

Technical data
- Type: Prime
- Focus drive: Stepper motor
- Focal length: 35 mm
- Focal length (35mm equiv.): 53 mm
- Aperture (max/min): f/2 - f/16
- Close focus distance: 0.39 metres (1.3 ft)
- Max. magnification: 1:0.15
- Diaphragm blades: 9
- Construction: 9 elements in 6 groups

Features
- Manual focus override: No No
- Weather-sealing: Yes Yes
- Lens-based stabilization: No No
- Aperture ring: Yes Yes

Physical
- Max. length: 45.9 millimetres (1.81 in)
- Diameter: 60 millimetres (2.4 in)
- Weight: 170 grams (0.37 lb)
- Filter diameter: 43 mm
- Color: black, silver

History
- Introduction: 2015

The Fujinon XF 35mm F2 R WR is an interchangeable standard prime lens for X-mount, announced by Fujifilm on October 21, 2015.
