= Fujifilm X-A5 =

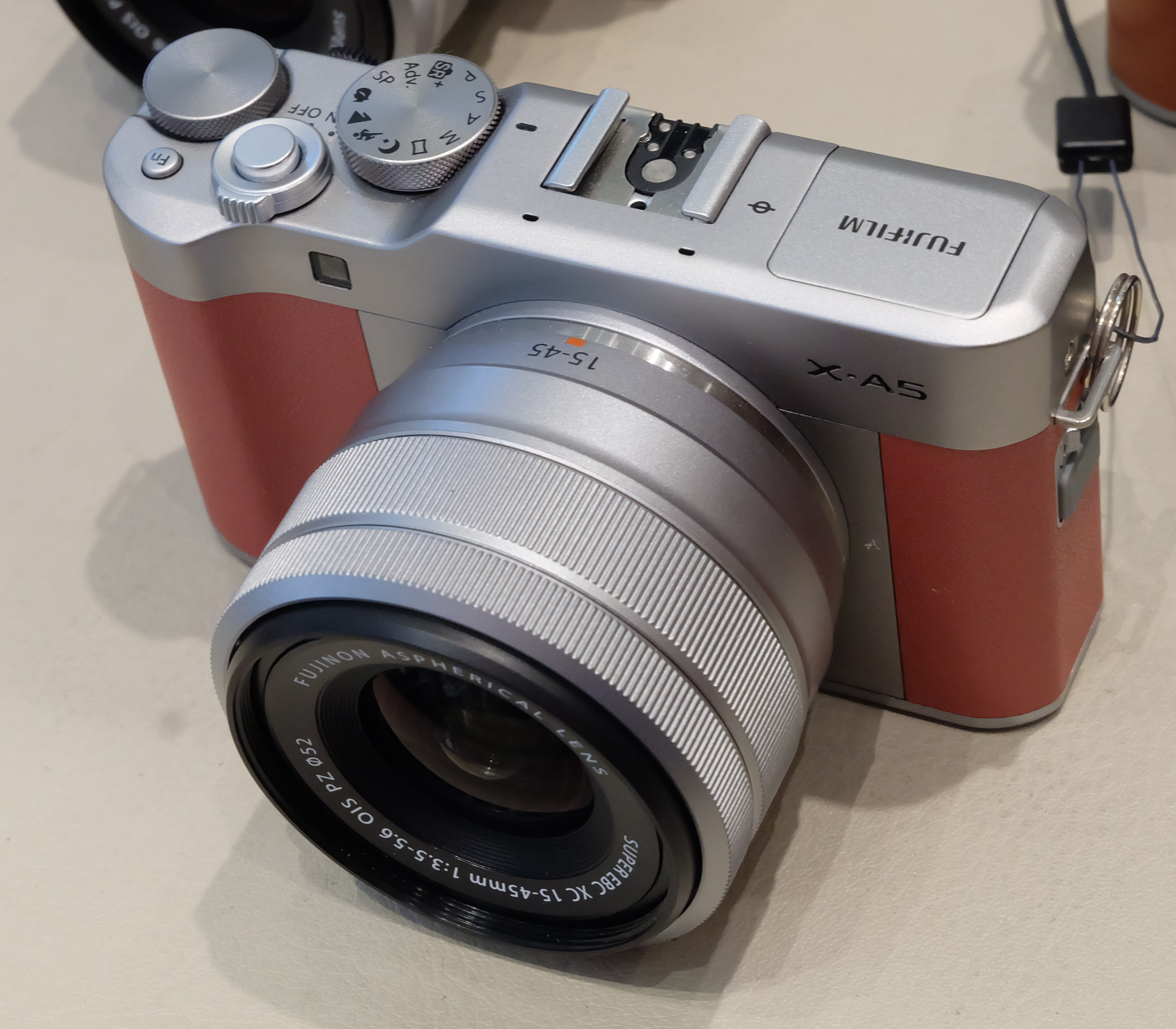
- Fujifilm X-A5

Overview
- Maker: Fujifilm
- Type: Mirrorless Camera
- Released: 31 January 2018
- Intro price: USD 599 (kit)

Lens
- Lens mount: Fujifilm X

Sensor/medium
- Sensor type: CMOS with Bayer filter
- Sensor size: 23.5 mm × 15.7 mm (APS-C)
- Maximum resolution: 6000 x 4000 (24.2 megapixels)
- Film speed: 200–12800 (standard); 100–51200 (extend)
- Recording medium: SD, SDHC, SDXC (UHS-I)
- Storage media: SD card

Focusing
- Focus: Hybrid TTL contrast detection / Phase detection
- Focus modes: Single point, Zone, Wide/Tracking
- Focus areas: 91 focus point

Exposure/metering
- Exposure: TTL 256-zones metering
- Exposure modes: Program, Aperture Priority, Shutter Speed Priority, Manual Exposure
- Metering modes: Multi, Spot, Average

Flash
- Flash: Manual pop-up flash

Shutter
- Shutter: Focal Plane Shutter
- Shutter speeds: 4 s to 1/4000 s (mechanical), 4 s to 1/32000 s (electronic)
- Continuous shooting: 6 frames per second

Viewfinder
- Viewfinder: none

Image processing
- White balance: Yes

General
- Video recording: MOV; 4K up to 15 fps, 1080p up to 60 fps
- LCD screen: 3.0 inches 1.04M dots with touchscreen
- Battery: NP-W126S Li-ion
- AV port(s): 2.5 mm audio jack, HDMI D
- Data port: USB 2.0, Wi-Fi 4, Bluetooth 4.1
- Dimensions: 116.9 mm × 67.7 mm × 40.4 mm (4.60 in × 2.67 in × 1.59 in)
- Weight: 361 g (13 oz) (0.796 lb) including battery and memory card
- Made in: Indonesia

Chronology
- Predecessor: Fujifilm X-A3
- Successor: Fujifilm X-A7

The Fujifilm X-A5 is a rangefinder-style digital mirrorless interchangeable lens camera (MILC) by Fujifilm, which was released on February 15, 2018.

The X-A7 succeeds the X-A5. The X-A7 was announced on September 12, 2019.

== Features ==
The Fujifilm X-A5 is the successor of the X-A3, with an improved autofocus system, two times faster than the X-A3. The scene recognition accuracy and color reproduction are also improved, particularly for flesh tones.

== Key Features ==
- 24.2 Megapixels
- 23.5 mm x 15.7 mm CMOS sensor (APS-C)
- Improved autofocus
- Tilt LCD with touchscreen
- 11 types of selectable film simulations
- Hybrid autofocus
- Face detection
- Eye detection
- 15fps 4K video
- 4K Burst, 4K Multi Focus
- WiFi connectivity
- Bluetooth connectivity
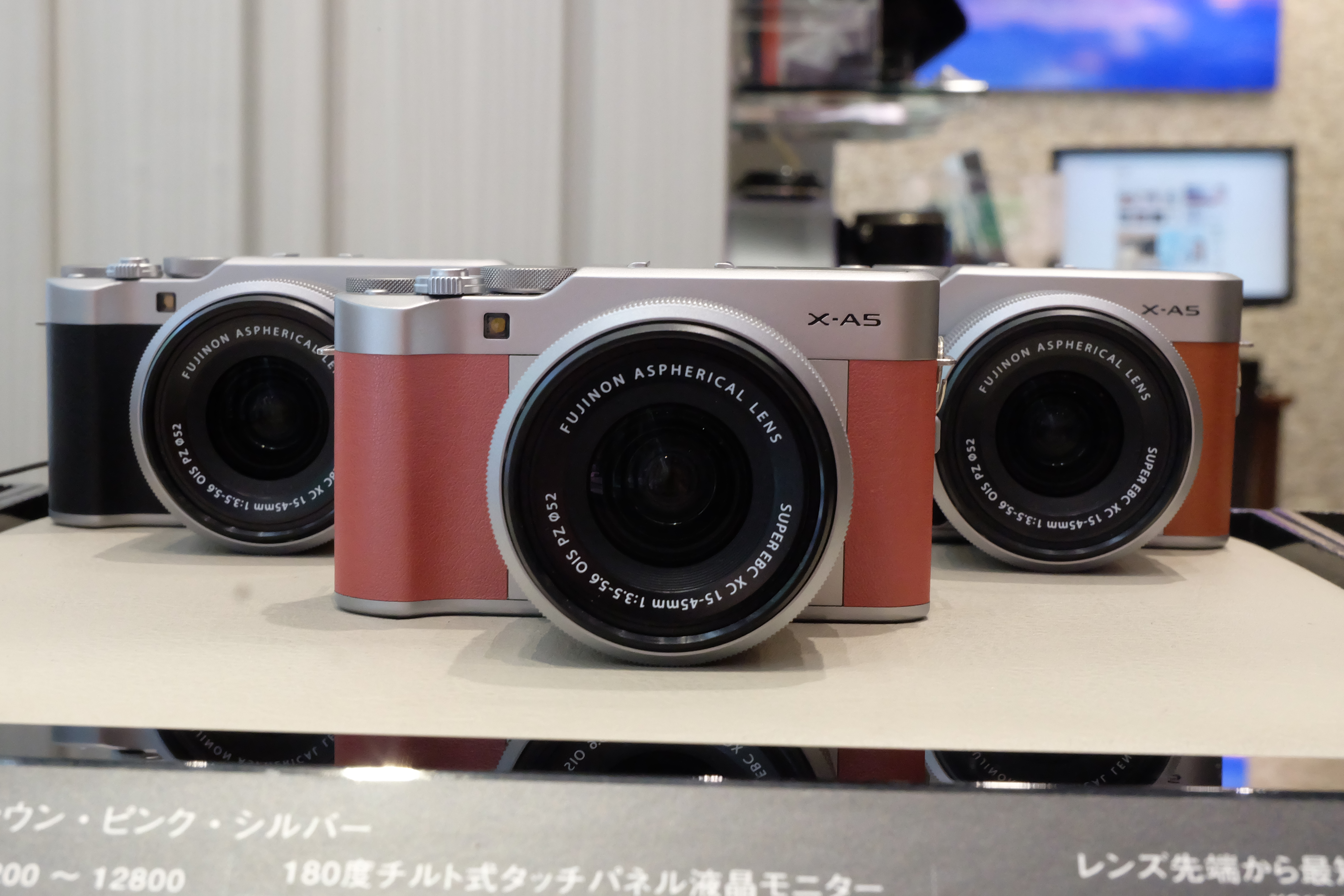

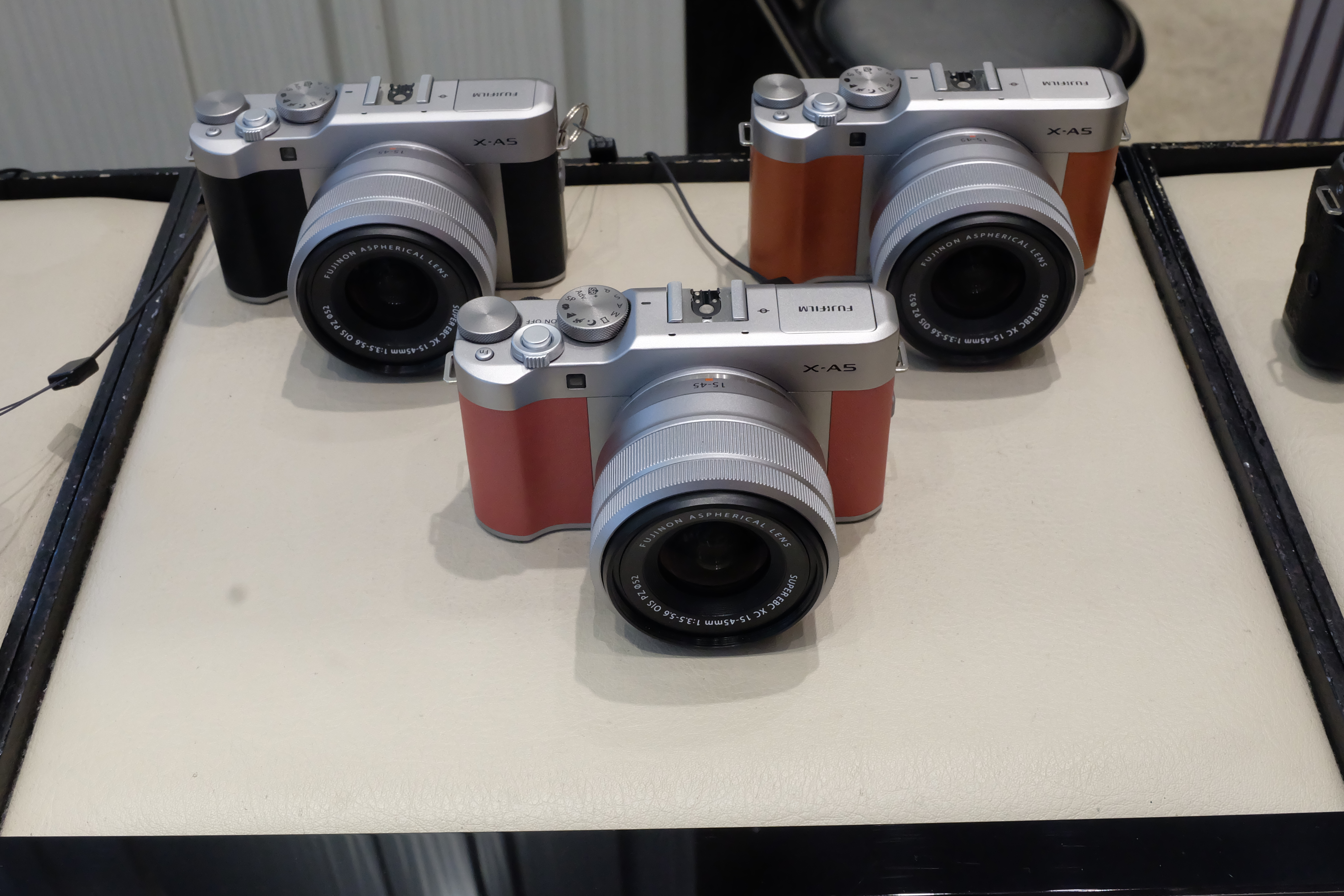

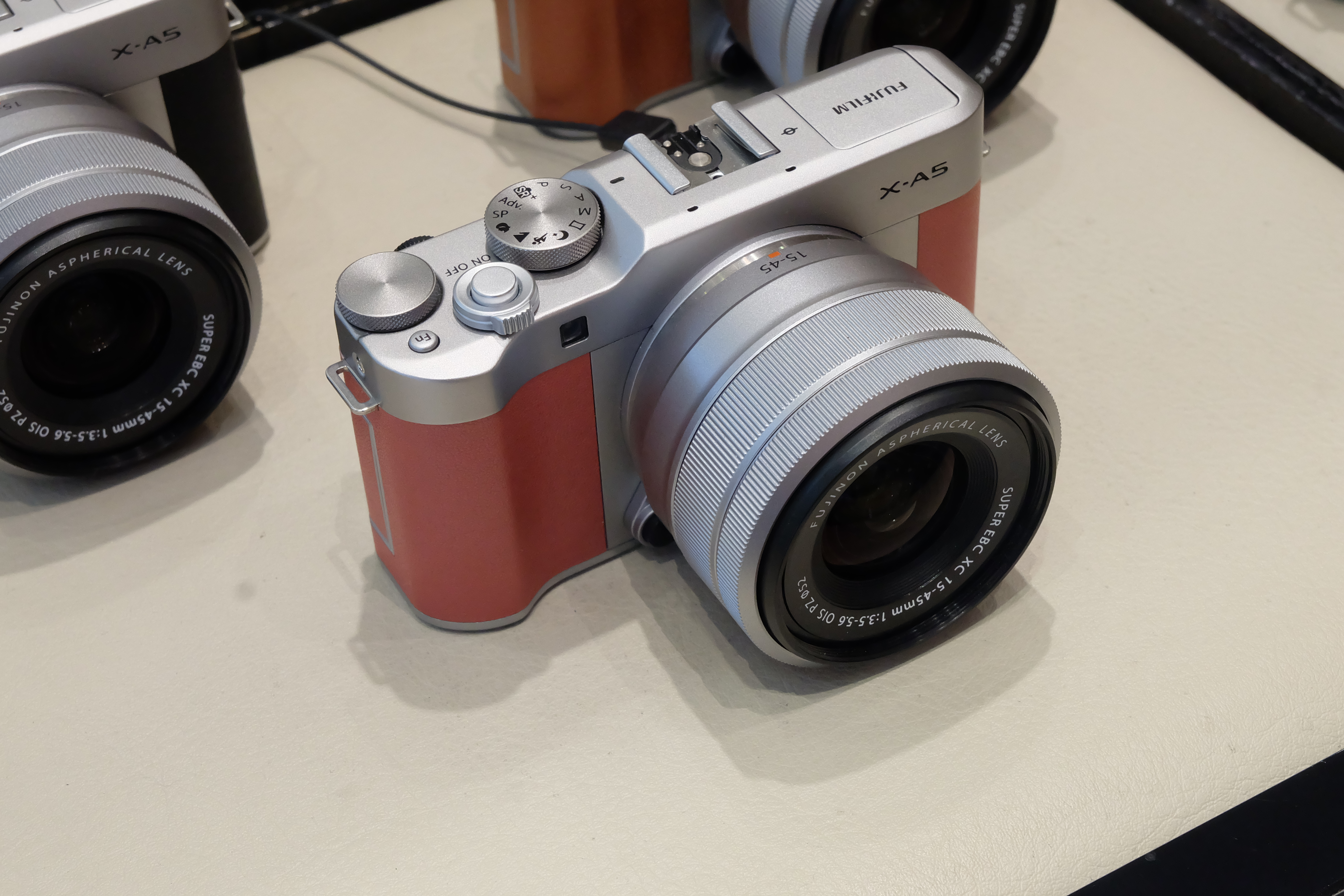

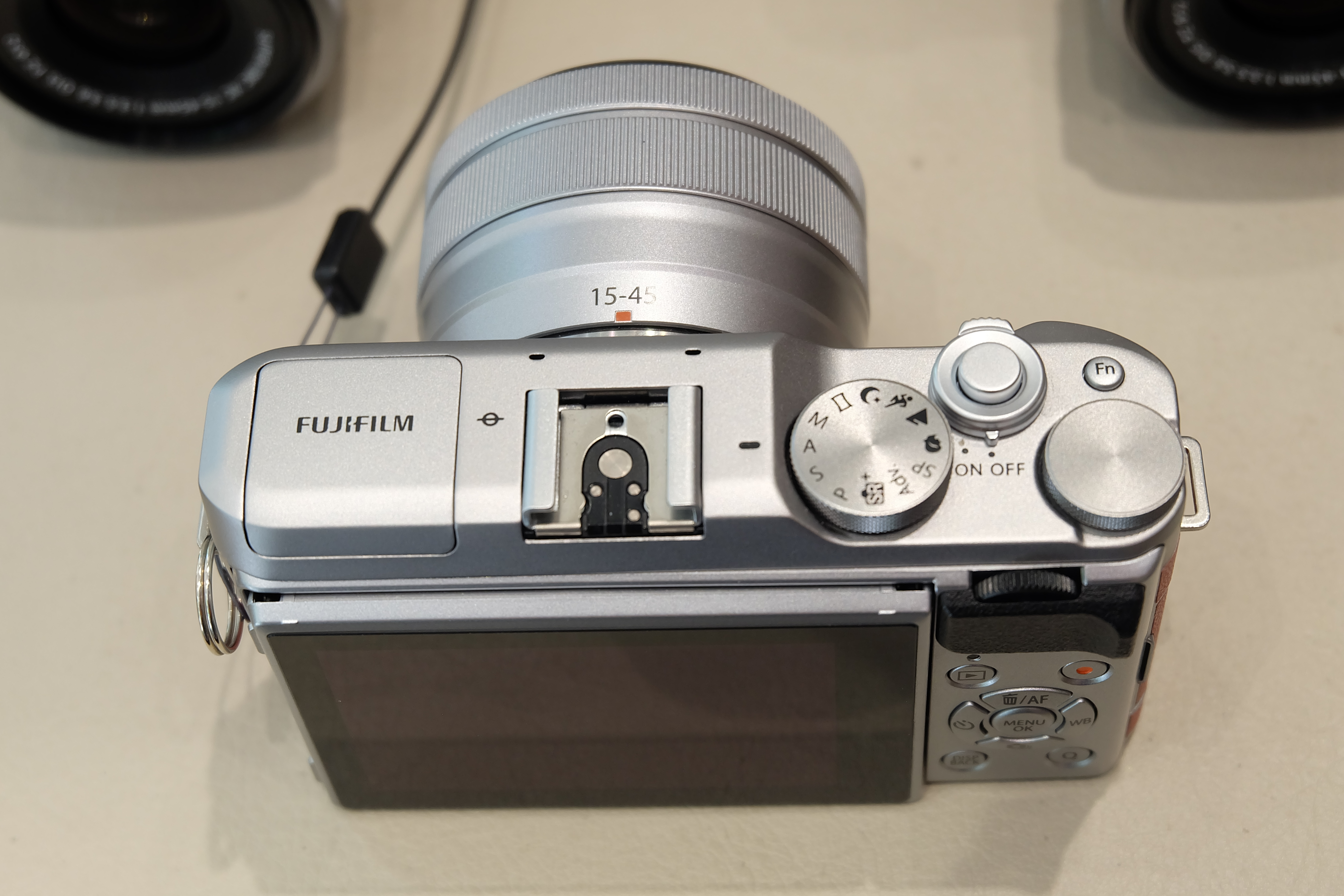

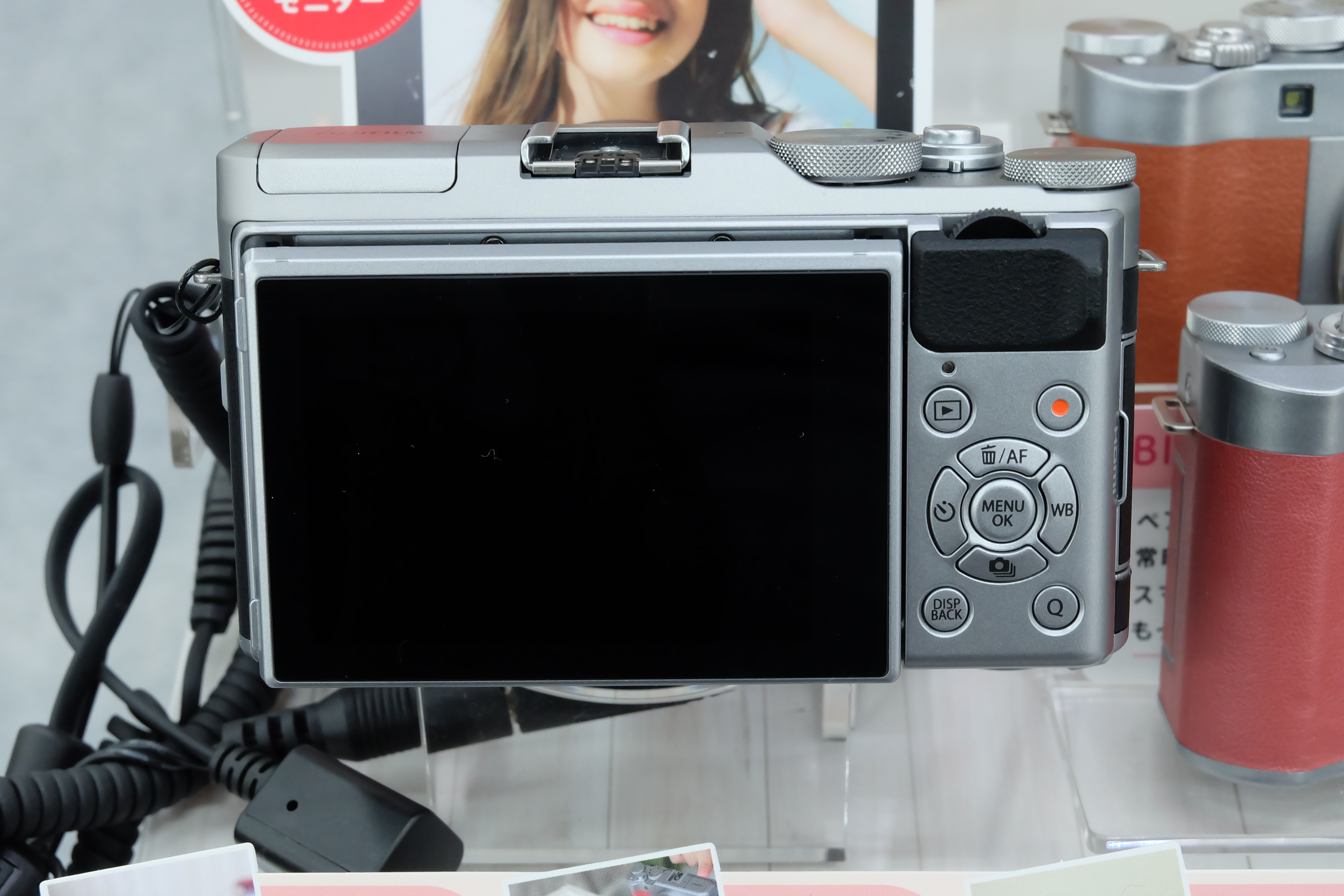

== See also ==
- List of retro-style digital cameras

Type	Lens	2011	2012	2013	2014	2015	2016	2017	2018	2019	2020	2021	2022	2023	2024	2025
MILC	G-mount; Medium format sensor							GFX 50S ^{F} ^{T}					GFX 50S II ^{F} ^{T}			
MILC	G-mount; Medium format sensor									GFX 50R ^{F} ^{T}						
MILC	G-mount; Medium format sensor										GFX 100 ^{F} ^{T}					GFX 100 II ^{F} ^{T}
MILC	G-mount; Medium format sensor											GFX 100 IR ^{F} ^{T}				
MILC	G-mount; Medium format sensor											GFX 100S ^{F} ^{T}				GFX 100S II^{F} ^{T}
MILC	G-mount; Medium format sensor															GFX Eterna 55^{F} ^{T}
MILC	Prime lens Medium format sensor															GFX 100RF ^{F} ^{T}
MILC	X-mount; APS-C sensor		X-Pro1				X-Pro2				X-Pro3 ^{f} ^{T}					
MILC	X-mount; APS-C sensor								X-H1 ^{F} ^{T}					X-H2 ^{A} ^{T}		
MILC	X-mount; APS-C sensor													X-H2S ^{A} ^{T}		
MILC	X-mount; APS-C sensor											X-S10 ^{A} ^{T}			X-S20 ^{A} ^{T}	
MILC	X-mount; APS-C sensor				X-T1 ^{f}			X-T2 ^{F}		X-T3 ^{F} ^{T}		X-T4 ^{A} ^{T}		X-T5 ^{F} ^{T}		
MILC	X-mount; APS-C sensor						X-T10 ^{f}	X-T20 ^{f} ^{T}		X-T30 ^{f} ^{T}			X-T30 II ^{f} ^{T}			X-T50 ^{f} ^{T}
MILC	X-mount; APS-C sensor									_{15} X-T100 ^{F} ^{T}	X-T200 ^{A} ^{T}					X-T30 III ^{f} ^{T}
MILC	X-mount; APS-C sensor			X-E1	X-E2		X-E2s		X-E3 ^{T}			X-E4 ^{f} ^{T}				X-E5 ^{f} ^{T}
MILC	X-mount; APS-C sensor				X-M1 ^{f}											X-M5 ^{A} ^{T}
MILC	X-mount; APS-C sensor				X-A1 ^{f}	X-A2 ^{f}		X-A3 ^{f} ^{T}	_{15} X-A5 ^{f} ^{T}		X-A7 ^{A} ^{T}					
MILC	X-mount; APS-C sensor							X-A10 ^{f}	X-A20 ^{f} ^{T}							
Compact	Prime lens APS-C sensor	X100		X100S		X100T		X100F			X100V ^{f} ^{T}				X100VI ^{f} ^{T}	
Compact	Prime lens APS-C sensor						X70 ^{f} ^{T}			XF10 ^{T}						
Compact	Prime lens 1" sensor															X half ^{T}
Compact	Zoom lens^{2}/_{3}" sensor		X10	X20		X30 ^{f}										
Compact	Zoom lens^{2}/_{3}" sensor				XQ1	XQ2										
Compact	Zoom lens^{2}/_{3}" sensor			XF1												
Bridge	^{2}/_{3}" sensor		X-S1 ^{f}													
Type	Lens															
Type	Lens	2011	2012	2013	2014	2015	2016	2017	2018	2019	2020	2021	2022	2023	2024	2025
