= Fujinon XF 16mm F1.4 R WR =

Camera lens

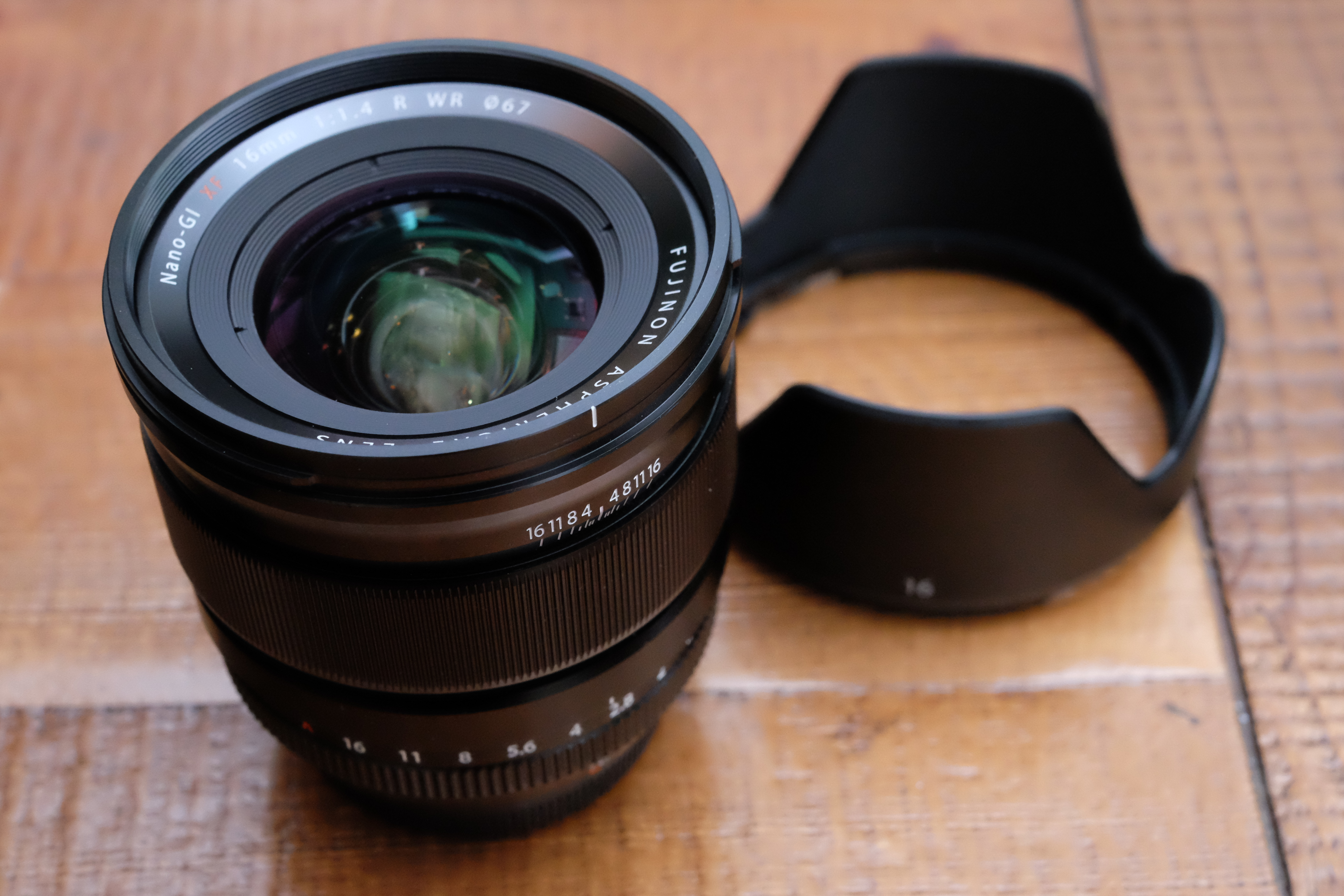
- Maker: Fujifilm
- Lens mount(s): Fujifilm X

Technical data
- Type: Prime
- Focal length: 16mm
- Focal length (35mm equiv.): 24mm
- Aperture (max/min): f/1.4
- Close focus distance: 0.15 metres (0.49 ft)
- Max. magnification: 0.21
- Diaphragm blades: 9
- Construction: 13 elements in 11 groups

Features
- Weather-sealing: Yes Yes
- Lens-based stabilization: No No
- Aperture ring: Yes Yes
- Application: Landscape, architecture

Physical
- Max. length: 73 millimetres (2.9 in)
- Diameter: 73 millimetres (2.9 in)
- Weight: 375 grams (0.827 lb)
- Filter diameter: 67mm

History
- Introduction: 2015

The Fujinon XF 16mm F1.4 R WR is an interchangeable camera lens announced by Fujifilm on April 16, 2015. It has an unusually wide maximum aperture given its focal length, and is weather-sealed.
