= Fujifilm X-mount =

Type of interchangeable lens mount

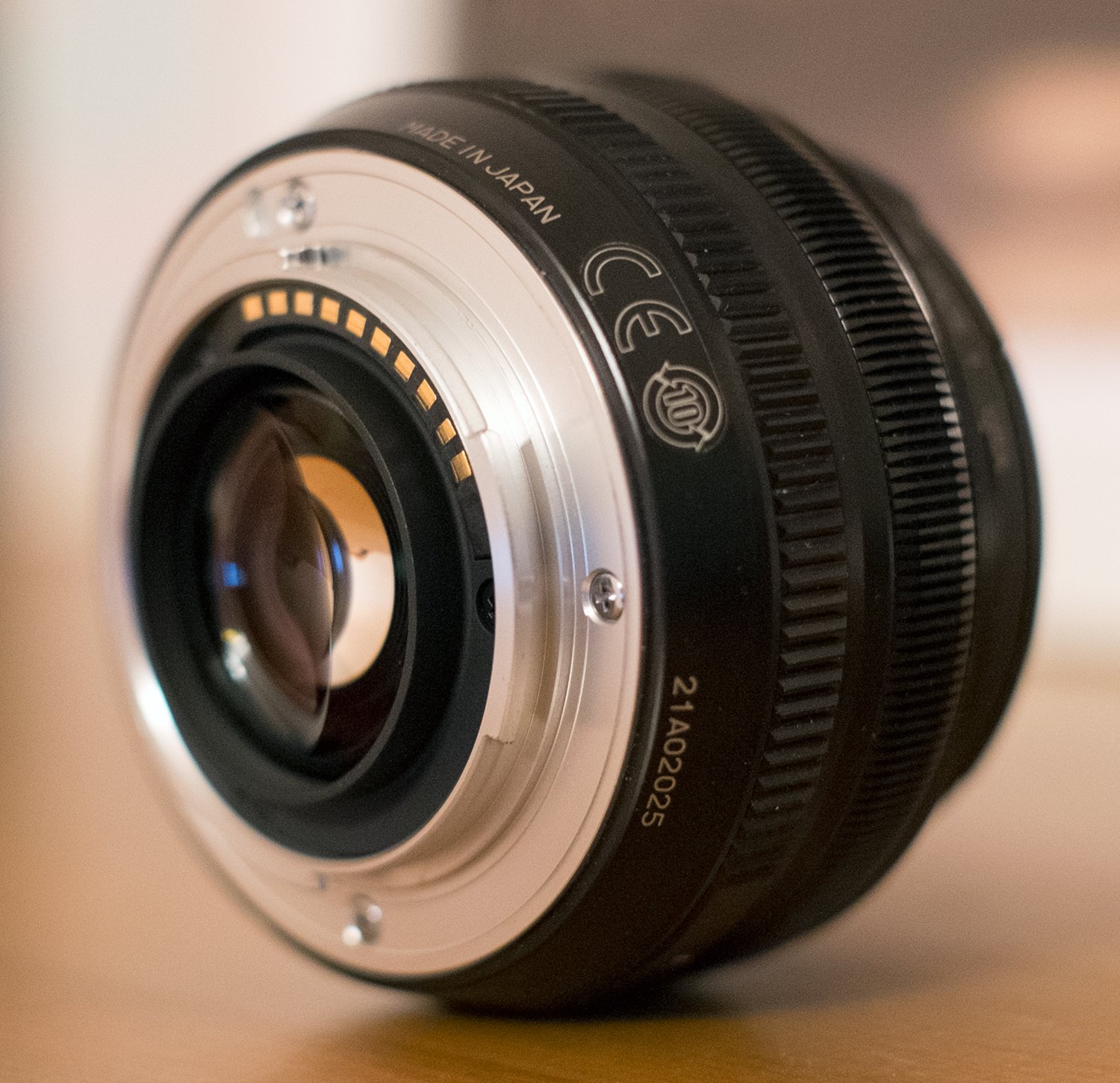
- Fujifilm X-mount on Fujinon XF18mm lens
- Type: Internal bayonet
- Inner diameter: 44 mm
- Tabs: 3
- Flange: 17.7 mm
- Connectors: 10
- Introduced: 2012

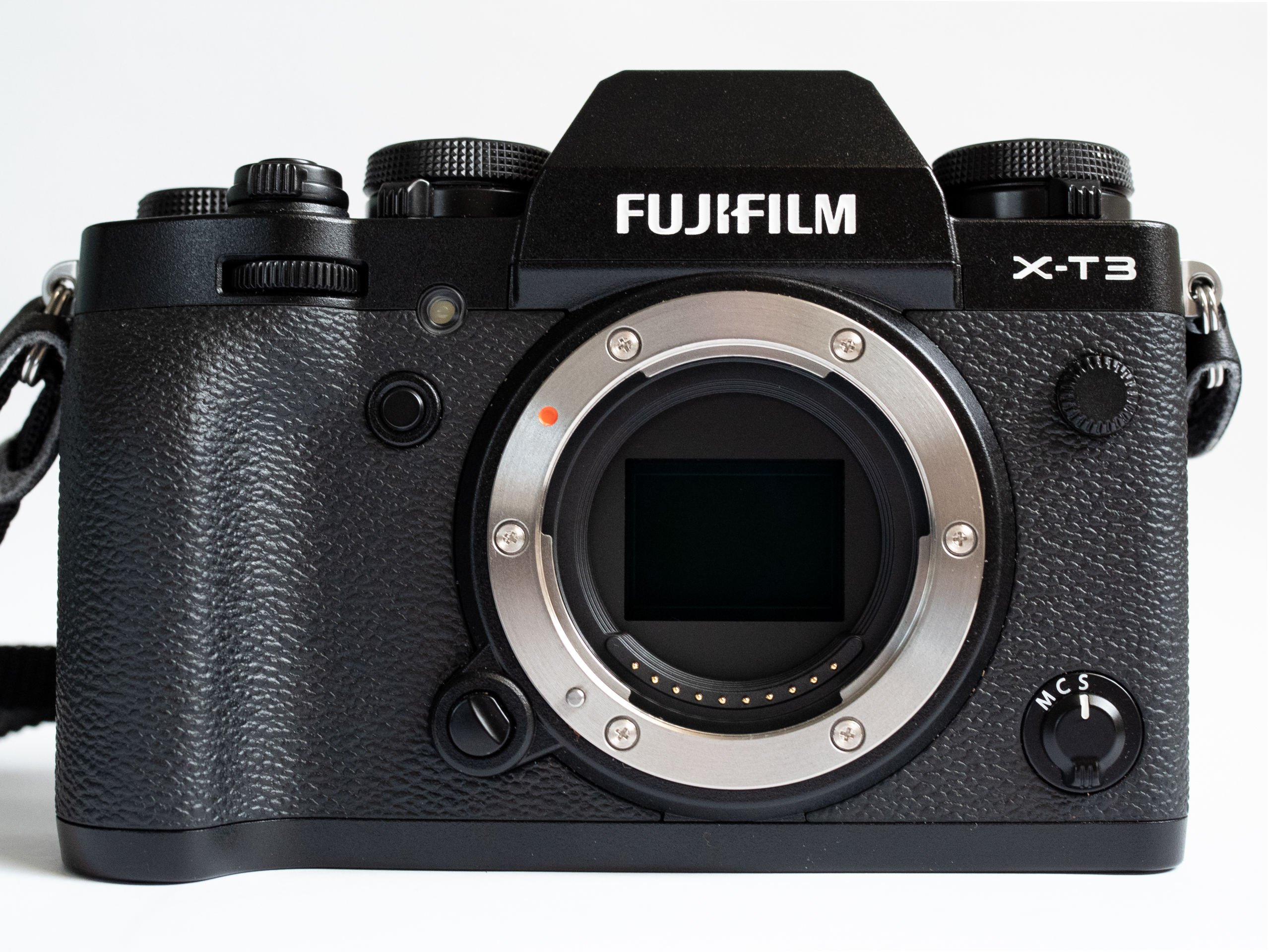
X-mount on Fujifilm X-T3 camera

The Fujifilm X-mount is a lens mount for Fujifilm interchangeable lens mirrorless cameras in its X-series, designed for 23.6mm x 15.6mm APS-C sensors.

Various lens manufacturers use this mount, such as Fujifilm's own XF and XC lenses, Carl Zeiss AG (Touit lenses), Samyang Optics, Handevision, SLR Magic, Viltrox and Zhongyi Optics. Additionally, a host of adapters for a range of SLR lenses are available, allowing the mounting of lenses (without autofocus or auto aperture) from Canon, Nikon, Pentax, Minolta, Contax/Yashica, Konica and more. This mount type should not be confused with the discontinued Fujica X-mount, which is not compatible with the newer X-mount without an adapter.

== Fujifilm X-Mount cameras ==
The X-mount was first announced in January 2012 with its use in the X-Pro1 body.

Fujifilm has released the following cameras that use the X-mount:

Style	2012	2013	2014	2015	2016	2017	2018	2019	2020	2021	2022	2023	2024	2025	2026
Rangefinder-style appearance	X-Pro1				X-Pro2				X-Pro3						
Rangefinder-style appearance		X-E1	X-E2		X-E2s		X-E3			X-E4					X-E5
SLR (Classic)			X-T1			X-T2		X-T3	X-T4			X-T5			
SLR (Classic)					X-T10	X-T20			X-T30		X-T30 II			X-T50	
SLR (Classic)														X-T30 III	
DSLR (Hybrid/PASM)							X-H1					X-H2			
DSLR (Hybrid/PASM)												X-H2S			
DSLR (Hybrid/PASM)										X-S10			X-S20		
Entry-level			X-M1											X-M5	
Entry-level			X-A1	X-A2		X-A3	X-A5		X-A7						
Entry-level						X-A10	X-A20								
Entry-level								X-T100	X-T200						

Sensor: Bayer | X-Trans | X-Trans II | X-Trans III | X-Trans IV | X-Trans V|

== Fujinon XF and XC lenses ==
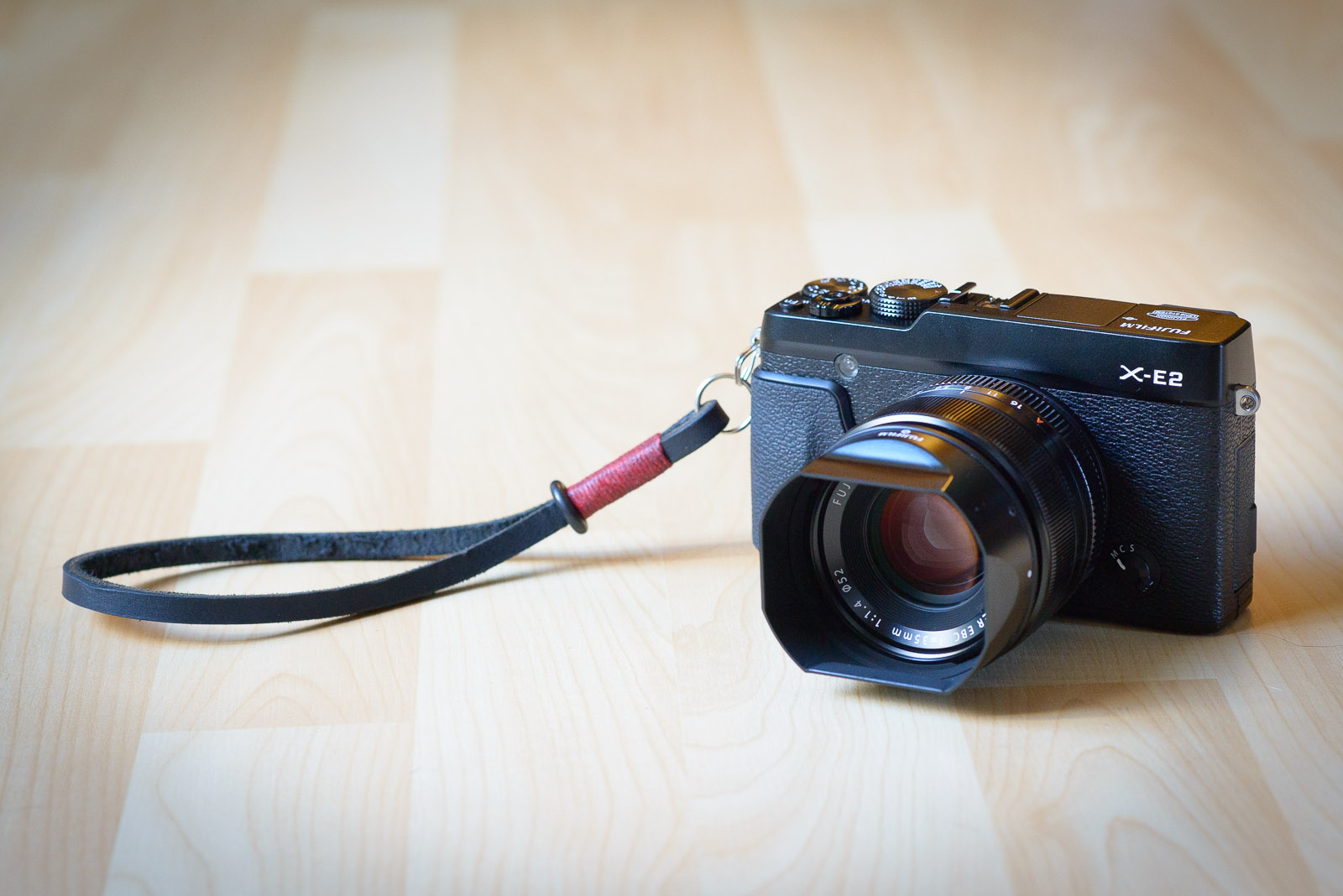
Fujifilm X-E2 with Fujinon XF 35mm f/1.4

Fujifilm's "XF" and "XC" lenses bear Fujifilm's brand "Fujinon", which is used for optics within the company. The "XF" lenses are of higher quality and more robust than the "XC" lenses. The housing and lens mount of the "XF" lenses are made of metal, while the housing and lens mount of the "XC" lenses are mainly made of plastic. In addition, only the "XF" lenses have an aperture ring.

The following lenses are natively operational on the Fujifilm X-mount cameras.

=== XC prime lenses ===
- Fujinon XC 35mm f/2: A compact and lightweight prime lens with a quick and near silent autofocus. Announced January 23, 2020

=== XC zoom lenses ===
These are entry level zoom lenses with smaller maximum aperture and plastic bodies.

- Fujinon XC 15-45mm f/3.5-5.6 OIS PZ: This is a lightweight, collapsible, consumer-grade power zoom lens with a short 13 cm close focusing distance. It is the kit lens for the X-A5 and X-T100, as well as their respective successors, the X-A7 and the X-T200.
- Fujinon XC 16-50mm f/3.5-5.6 OIS: This lens is a consumer-grade standard zoom, covering wide angle to short telephoto, equivalent to 24–76 mm on a full frame camera. The lens is the 'kit' lens for the X-M1 camera, and has a lower end build quality than the other Fujinon lenses, while maintaining good optical quality. This lens is the first lens in the new 'XC' line and does not have an aperture ring. Officially announced on June 24, 2013.
- Fujinon XC 16-50mm f/3.5-5.6 OIS II: Has a shorter 15 cm macro focusing distance than the original XC 16-50mm zoom's 30 cm. Delivered in 2015.
- Fujinon XC 50-230mm f/4.5-6.7 OIS: This is a consumer-grade telephoto zoom with optical stabilization and a relatively slow aperture.
- Fujinon XC 50-230mm f/4.5-6.7 OIS II: Improved optical stabilization.

=== XF compact / standard prime lenses ===
- Fujinon XF 14mm f/2.8 R: This ultra-wide angle lens has a focus-clutch mechanism for switching to manual focus. The lens was announced in September, 2012.
- Fujinon XF 16mm f/2.8 R WR: A compact wide-angle lens often considered one of the four so-called "Fujicron" lenses (16, 23, 35, 50)
- Fujinon XF 18mm f/2.0 R: A wide-angle pancake style lens and one of the original three lenses for the X system.
- Fujinon XF 23mm f/2.8 R WR: This is a wide standard lens with a very slim pancake design. This lens has an aperture ring. The lens was announced on June 12, 2025, alongside the X-E5 body, and was also offered as part of a kit.
- Fujinon XF 27mm f/2.8: This is a wide standard lens with a very slim pancake design. This lens does not have an aperture ring like most lenses in the Fujinon lineup. The lens was officially announced on June 24, 2013.
- Fujinon XF 27mm f/2.8 R WR: updated version of the aforementioned lens with the addition of an aperture ring, optical revisions with an improved refractive index, and weather resistance.

=== XF fast prime lenses ===
These lenses are those with maximum apertures of f/2 or larger.

- Fujinon XF 16mm f/1.4 R WR: Fast aperture, wide angle lens with a weather-resistant structure. Announced April 2015.
- Fujinon XF 18mm f/1.4 R LM WR: Fast aperture, wide angle lens with a linear motor for fast focus and weather-resistant seals. Equivalent to 28 mm full-frame.
- Fujinon XF 23mm f/1.4 R: This is a fast moderate wide angle lens, equivalent to a 35 mm lens in field of view on a full-frame camera.
- Fujinon XF 23mm f/2 R WR: This is a fast moderate wide angle lens, equivalent to a 35 mm lens in field of view on a full-frame camera. Compared to original 23mm f/1.4 features improved autofocus speeds and weather resistance.
- Fujinon XF 35mm f/1.4 R: A fast normal prime lens. One of the original three lenses for the X system. Released in 2011, the prime 35mm f/1.4 (52.5mm equivalent) lens has no image stabilisation and is not weather resistance in comparison to the newer 35mm f/2 lens.
- Fujinon XF 35mm f/1.4 R WR: A fast normal prime lens. Compared to original 35mm f/1.4 features improved autofocus speeds and weather resistance.
- Fujinon XF 50mm f/1.0 R WR: The fastest autofocus lens by Fujifilm. Announced September 3, 2020.
- Fujinon XF 50mm f/2 R WR: A fast mid-telephoto lens suitable for portraiture. Part of Fujifilm's lineup of compact and lightweight lenses which include the XF 23mmF2 and XF 35mmF2.
- Fujinon XF 56mm f/1.2 R: This is a standard portrait length lens, with a field of view similar to an 85 mm lens on a full frame camera with an f/1.2 aperture. Officially announced on January 6, 2014.
- Fujinon XF 56mm f/1.2 R APD: Similar to the earlier 56 mm f/1.2 R, but adds an apodizing filter to optimize bokeh for portrait shooting. Officially announced on September 10, 2014.
- Fujinon XF 56mm f/1.2 R WR: Successor to the Fujinon XF 56mm f/1.2 R.
- Fujinon XF 90mm f/2 R LM WR: A longer focal length portrait lens. The first lens to use Quad Linear Motor autofocus, plus the lens is also weather-resistant. Officially announced on May 18, 2015.
- Fujinon XF 200mm f/2 R LM OIS WR

=== XF macro lenses ===
- Fujinon XF 30mm f/2.8 R LM WR Macro: A light and compact 1:1 Macro lens. Officially announced in November 2022.
- Fujinon XF 60mm f/2.4 R Macro: Short telephoto lens suitable for portraiture. Focuses close to allow 1:2 magnification macro shooting. One of the original three lenses for the X system.
- Fujinon XF 80mm f/2.8 R LM OIS WR Macro: A telephoto 1:1 Macro lens. First prime lens in the XF line to use OIS. Officially announced on September 7, 2017.

=== XF zoom lenses ===
- Fujinon XF 10-24mm f/4 R OIS: An ultra-wide angle zoom lens with image stabilization. Officially announced on December 18, 2013.
- Fujinon XF 10-24mm f/4 R OIS WR: A weather-resistant, ultra-wide angle zoom lens with image stabilization. Officially announced on October 15, 2020.
- Fujinon XF 16-50mm f/2.8-4.8 R LM WR: A weather-resistant, standard zoom lens and kit lens. Officially announced on May 16, 2024.
- Fujinon XF 18-55mm f/2.8-4 R LM OIS: The first zoom lens for the X-mount, this lens has a wide angle to short telephoto zoom range, with a fast maximum aperture and optical image stabilization.
- Fujinon XF 18-120mm f/4 LM PZ WR: A weather-resistant, powered superzoom, optimized for video.
- Fujinon XF 18-135mm f/3.5–5.6 R LM OIS WR: A weather-resistant, image-stabilized superzoom, covering focal lengths equivalent to 27–202.5 mm on full-frame. Officially announced on June 16, 2014.
- Fujinon XF 55-200mm f/3.5-4.8 R LM OIS: A telephoto zoom lens with fast maximum aperture. Officially announced on April 17, 2013.
- Fujinon XF 70-300mm f/4-5.6 R LM OIS WR: A weather-resistant telephoto zoom with image stabilization, covering focal lengths equivalent to 107–457 mm on full-frame. Officially announced on January 27, 2021.

=== XF "Red Badge" high-end zoom lenses ===
- Fujinon XF 8-16mm f/2.8 R LM WR: released in November 2018.
- Fujinon XF 16-55mm f/2.8 R LM WR: An enthusiast-level standard zoom, covering focal lengths equivalent to 24–82.5 mm on full-frame, with weather-resistant construction. Officially announced on January 6, 2015, during CES 2015.
- Fujinon XF 16-55mm f/2.8 R LM WR II: A Revision to the 2015 lens, released on October 14, 2024. Making it lighter, sharper and smaller.
- Fujinon XF 50-140mm f/2.8 R LM OIS WR: A weather-resistant telephoto zoom with image stabilization, covering focal lengths equivalent to 75–210 mm on full-frame. Officially announced on September 10, 2014.
- Fujinon XF 100-400mm f/4.5-5.6 R LM OIS WR: A weather-resistant telephoto zoom with image stabilization, covering focal lengths equivalent to 150–600 mm on full-frame.
- Fujinon XF 150-600mm f/5.6-8 R LM OIS WR: A weather-resistant telephoto zoom with image stabilization, covering focal lengths equivalent to 225–900 mm on full-frame.

=== Fujinon line-up specification comparison tables ===
Fujinon X mount Zoom lenses
Model	Min focal length (mm )	Max focal length (mm )	Max aperture	Min aperture	Aperture ring (R)	Nb AP. Blades	Focus Range (CM)	Max mag.	Linear motor (LM)	Optical image stabilization (OIS)	Weather resistant (WR)	Filter thread (mm )	Weight (g)	Date introduced	Made in	Note
XF8-16mm F2.8 R LM WR	8	16	2.8	22	R	9	25-∞	0.1x	LM	-	WR	-	805	2018-07-20	Japan	Red Badge
XF10-24mm F4 R OIS	10	24	4.0	22	R	7	24-∞	0.16x	-	OIS	-	72	410	2013-12-18	Japan	superseded by WR version
XF10-24mm F4 R OIS WR	10	24	4.0	22	R	7	24-∞	0.16x	-	OIS	WR	72	385	2020-10-15	Philippines	
XC 13-33mm F3.5-6.3 OIS	13	33	3.5	22	-	9	20.1-∞	?	-	OIS	-	49	125	2025-10-23	?	
XC15-45mm F3.5-5.6 OIS PZ	15	45	3.5-5.6	22	-	7	[Wide]:13-∞ [Tele]:35-∞	0.24x	-	OIS	-	52	136	2018-02-08	Philippines	
XC16-50mm F3.5-5.6 OIS I	16	50	3.5-5.6	22	-	?	?	?	-	OIS	-	58	195	2013-06-24	China	superseded by OIS II version
XC16-50mm F3.5-5.6 OIS II	16	50	3.5-5.6	22	-	7	Normal:60-∞ Macro:[wide]15 -100[Tele]35-100	0.2x	-	OIS	-	58	195	2015-01-15	China	superseded by XC15-45mm F3.5-5.6 OIS PZ
XF16-50mm F2.8-4.8 R LM WR	16	50	2.8-4.8	22	R	9	24-∞	0.3x	LM	-	WR	58	240	2024-05-16	Philippines	
XF16-55mm F2.8 R LM WR	16	55	2.8	22	R	9	Normal:60-∞ Macro:[Wide]30 -100 [Tele]40-100	0.16x	LM	-	WR	77	655	2015-01-06	Japan or Philippines	Red Badge superseded by II version
XF16-55mm F2.8 R LM WR II	16	55	2.8	22	R	11	30-∞	0.21x	LM	-	WR	72	410	2024-10-14	-	Red Badge
XF16-80mm F4 R OIS WR	16	80	4	22	R	9	35-∞	0.25x		OIS	WR	72	440	2019-07-17	Philippines	
XF18-55mm F2.8-4 R LM OIS	18	55	2.8-4	22	R	7	Normal:60-∞ Macro:[wide]30-100 [Tele]40-100	0.15x	LM	OIS	-	58	310	2012-09-06	Japan or China or Philippines	
XF18-120mm F4 LM PZ WR	18	120	4.0	22	-	7	60-∞	0.2x	LM	-	WR	72	460	2022-05-31	Japan	
XF18-135mm F3.5-5.6 R LM OIS WR	18	135	3.5-5.6	22	R	7	Normal:60-∞ Macro:45-∞	0.27x	LM	OIS	WR	67	490	2014-06-16	China	
XF50-140mm F2.8 R LM OIS WR	50	140	2.8	22	R	7	Normal:100-∞ Macro:100-300	0.12x	LM	OIS	WR	72	995	2014-09-10	Japan	Red Badge
XC50-230mm F4.5-6.7 OIS I	50	230	4.5-6.7	22	-	7	?	?	-	OIS	-	58	375	2013-09-17	China	superseded by II version
XC50-230mm F4.5-6.7 OIS II	50	230	4.5-6.7	22	-	7	Normal:110-∞ Macro:110-300	0.2x	-	OIS	-	58	375	-	China	OIS II
XF55-200mm F3.5-4.8 R LM OIS	55	200	3.5-4.8	22	R	7	Normal:110-∞ Macro:110 -300	0.18x	LM	OIS	-	62	580	2013-04-17	Japan	
XF70-300mm F4-5.6 R LM OIS WR	70	300	4–5.6	22	R	9	0.83-∞	0.33x	LM	OIS	WR	67	580	2021-01-27	Philippines	
XF100-400mm F4.5-5.6 R LM OIS WR	100	400	4.5-5.6	22	R	9	175-∞	0.19x	LM	OIS	WR	77	1375	2016-01-15	Japan	Red Badge
XF150-600 F5.6-8.0 R LM OIS WR	150	600	5.6-8.0	22	R	9	240-∞	0.24x	LM	OIS	WR	82	1605	2022-05-31	Japan	Red Badge

Fujinon X mount Prime lenses
Model	Min focal length (mm )	Max aperture	Min aperture	Aperture ring (R)	Nb AP. Blades	Focus Range (CM)	Max mag.	Linear motor (LM)	Optical image stabilization (OIS)	Weather resistant (WR)	Filter thread (mm )	Weight (g)	Date introduced	Made in	Note
XF8mm f/3.5 R WR	8	3.5	22	R	9	18-∞	0.07x	-	No	WR	62	215	2023-05-24	Japan	
XF14mm F2.8 R	14	2.8	22	R	7	Normal:30-∞ Macro:18-∞	0.12x	-	No	-	58	235	2012-09-06	Japan	
XF16mm F1.4 R WR	16	1.4	16	R	9	15-∞	0.21x	-	No	WR	67	375	2015-04-16	Japan or Philippines	
XF16mm F2.8 R WR	16	2.8	22	R	9	17-∞	0.13x	-	No	WR	49	155	2019-02-14	Philippines	
XF18mm F1.4 R LM WR	18	1.4	18	R	9	20-∞	0.15x	LM	No	WR	62	370	2021-04-15	Philippines	
XF18mm F2 R	18	2.0	22	R	7	Normal:80-∞ Macro:18-200	0.14x	-	No	-	52	116	2012-01-09	Japan	
XF23mm F1.4 R	23	1.4	16	R	7	Normal:60-∞ Macro:28-∞	0.1x	-	No	-	62	300	2013-09-05	Japan	
XF23mm F1.4 R LM WR	23	1.4	16	R	9	19-∞	0.2x	LM	No	WR	58	375	2021-09-02	Japan	
XF23mm F2 R WR	23	2.0	16	R	9	22-∞	0.13x	-	No	WR	43	180	2016-08-25	Japan or Philippines	
XF23mm F2.8 R WR	23	2.8	16	R	11	20-∞	0.15x	-	No	WR	39	90	2025-06-12	Japan or Philippines	
XF27mm F2.8	27	2.8	16	-	7	Normal:60-∞ Macro:34-∞	0.1x	-	No	-	39	78	2013-06-24	China	superseded by WR version
XF27mm F2.8 R WR	27	2.8	16	R	7	Normal:60-∞ Macro:34-∞	0.1x	-	No	WR	39	78	2021-01-27	Philippines	
XF30mm F2.8 R LM WR Macro	30	2.8	22	R	9	10-∞	1.0x	LM	No	WR	43	195	2022-11-02	Thailand	
XF33mm F1.4 R LM WR	33	1.4	16	R	9	30-∞	0.15x	LM	No	WR	58	360	2021-09-02	Philippines	-
XF35mm F1.4 R	35	1.4	16	R	7	Normal:80-∞ Macro:28-200	0.17x	-	No	-	52	187	2012-01-09	Japan	
XF35mm F2 R WR	35	2.0	16	R	9	35-∞	0.135x	-	No	WR	43	170	2015-11-01	Japan	
XC35mm F2	35	2.0	16	-	9	35-∞	0.135x	-	No	-	43	130	2020-01-23	Indonesia	
XF50mm F1.0 R WR	50	1.0	16	R	9	70-∞	0.08x	-	No	WR	77	845	2020-09-03	Japan	Fastest auto-focus lens
XF50mm F2 R WR	50	2.0	16	R	9	38-∞	0.15x	-	No	WR	46	200	2017-02-23	Japan	
XF56mm F1.2 R	56	1.2	16	R	9	Normal:70-∞ Macro:70-300	0.09x	-	No	-	62	405	2014-01-06	Japan	superseded by WR version
XF56mm F1.2 R APD	56	1.2	16	R	9	Normal:70-∞ Macro:70-300	0.09x	-	No	-	62	405	2014-09-10	Japan	Apodization Filter
XF56mm F1.2 R WR	56	1.2	16	R	11	50-∞	0.14x	-	No	WR	67	445	2022-09-08	Thailand	
XF60mm F2.4 R Macro	60	2.4	22	R	9	Normal:60-∞ Macro:26.7-200	0.5x	-	No	-	39	215	2012-01-09	Japan	1:2 Macro
XF80mm F2.8 R LM OIS WR Macro	80	2.8	22	R	9	25-∞	1x	LM	OIS	WR	62	750	2017-10-??	Japan	1:1 Macro
XF90mm F2 R LM WR	90	2.0	16	R	7	60-∞	0.2x	LM	No	WR	62	540	2015-05-18	Japan	
XF200mm F2 R LM OIS WR	200	2.0	22	R	9	180-∞	0.12x	LM	OIS	WR	105	2,265	2018-07-20	Japan	Red Badge
XF400mmF4.5 R LM OIS WR	400	4.5	22	R	9	275-∞	0.16x	LM	OIS	WR	95	1,245	2026-09-03	Japan	Red Badge
XF500mm F/5.6 R LM OIS WR	500	5.6	22	R	9	275-∞	0.2x	LM	OIS	WR	95	1,335	2024	Japan	Red Badge

=== Short back focusing distance ===
By reducing the distance between the rear lens element and the sensor, a more compact construction is possible.

- XF18mm / Back focus distance: 11.0 mm
- XF35mm / Back focus distance: 21.9 mm
- XF60mm / Back focus distance: 21.0 mm

=== Teleconverter for X Mount lenses ===
A teleconverter is an optical accessory that extends the focal length of compatible lenses, effectively increasing magnification without altering the minimum focus distance. Fujifilm offers 1.4x and 2.0x teleconverters. These extenders maintain electronic communication between the lens and camera, enabling autofocus, image stabilization, and Exif data transmission. A teleconverter multiplies the apparent focal length of a given lens but also decrease the intensity of the light that reaches the sensor by the square of its magnification.

== Third Party Lenses ==
Until 2018, all third party lenses were manual except from the three Zeiss Touit lenses. In 2019, Viltrox introduced a 85 mm f/1.8 AF lens lacking an aperture ring. In April 2020, the same company introduced a 33 mm f/1.4 lens with an aperture ring. Two more Viltrox lenses, 23 mm f/1.4 and 56 mm f/1.4, are announced for 2020. On March 6, 2020, Tokina announced three atx-m autofocus lenses for Fujifilm X-mount to be introduced in autumn 2020. Toshihisa Iida, the General Manager of Fujifilm's Optical Device and Electronic Imaging Products Division, explained on April 14, 2020, that Fuji followed plans on opening the X-mount up to third-party lens manufacturers. The manufacturer Kenko Tokina was mentioned in this interview.

=== Autofocus lenses ===
Carl Zeiss lenses The Touit line of compact lenses from Carl Zeiss AG is purposely designed for APS-C like camera bodies. The optics of these lenses are designed by Carl Zeiss, but the design for manufacturing is done by the Japanese manufacturer Cosina. The Touit lenses are produced for a Fujifilm X-mount and Sony E-mount. Because Fujifilm did not share the specifications of the X-mount, Carl Zeiss never received officially the license for releasing X-mount lenses. The Touit lenses are therefore non-certified.

Samyang lenses Lenses are sold under the interchangeable Samyang, Rokinon, Walimex, and Bower brand names.

Sigma lenses Sigma has announced on Feb. 2022 the release of three new F1.4 prime lenses for Fujifilm X-mount camera systems. They are nearly identical to their predecessors, which were previously released for Canon EF-M mount, L-mount, Micro Four Thirds and Sony E-mount cameras.

==== Third Party Auto-focus lens comparison tables ====
Third Party Auto-focus Zoom lenses
Brand	Model name	Min focal length (mm)	Max focal length (mm)	Max aperture	Min aperture	Aperture ring (R)	Nb AP. Blades	Focus Range (cm)	Max mag.	Optical image stabilization (OIS)	Weather resistant (WR)	Filter thread (mm)	Weight (g)	Date introduced	Made in	Note
Sigma	10-18mm f/2.8 DC DN Contemporary	10	18	2.8	22	No	7	11.6-19.1	-	No	-	67	260	2023	Japan	
Sigma	16-300mm f3.5-6.7 DC OS Contemporary	16	300	3.5	22	-	-	-	-	Yes	No	67	-	-	Japan	
Sigma	17-40mm f/1.8 DC Art	17	40	1.8	16	Yes	?	?	?	No	Yes	67	530	10/072025	Japan	
Sigma	18-50mm f/2.8 DC DN Contemporary	18	50	2.8	22	No	7	12.1-30	-	No	-	55	290	01/11/2022	Japan	
Sigma	50–120mm f/2.8 DC OS Contemporary	50	120	2.8	22	Yes	11	(Wide) 23-∞; (Tele) 55-∞	0.33x	Yes	Yes	55	390	08/10/2026	Japan	
Sigma	100-400mm f/5-6.3DG DN OS Contemporary	100	400	5	29	No	9	-	-	Yes	No	67	1135	-	Japan	
Tamron	11-20mm f/2.8 Di III-A RXD	11	20	2.8	16	No	9	(Wide) 15-∞; (Tele) 24-∞	-	No	No	67	335	01/05/2023	China	
Tamron	16-50mm f/2.8 A	16	50	2.8	16	No	7	(Wide) 15-∞; (Tele) 29-∞	0.22x	No	Yes	55	305	17/12/2026	-	
Tamron	17-70mm F/2.8 Di III-A VC RXD	17	70	2.8	16	No	9	(Wide) 19-∞; (Tele) 39-∞	0.2x (Wide)	Yes	Yes	67	530	01/07/2022	Vietnam	
Tamron	18-300 MM F/3.5-6.3 DI III-A VC VXD	18	300	3.5	40	No	7	(Wide) 15-∞; (Tele) 99-∞	0.5x (Wide)	Yes	?	67	620	end of 2021	Vietnam	
Tamron	150-500mm f/5-6.7 Di III VC VXD	150	500	5	32	No	7	-	-	Yes	-	82	-	-	Vietnam	
Tokina	atx-m 11-18mm F2.8	11	18	2.8	22	No	9		-	-	-	67	320	March 14, 2025	China	

Third Party Auto-focus Prime lenses
Brand	Model name	Focal length (mm)	Max aperture	Min aperture	Aperture ring (R)	Nb AP. Blades	Focus Range (cm)	Max mag.	Optical image stabilization (OIS)	Weather resistant (WR)	Filter thread (mm)	Weight (g)	Date introduced	Made in	Note
7Artisans	AF 10mm F/2.8	10	2.8	16	No	7	30-∞		No	No	62	231	2025	China	
7Artisans	AF 27mm F2.8	27	2.8	16	No	6	30-∞	?	No	No	39	144	-	China	
7Artisans	AF 35mm F/1.4	35	1.4	16	No	7	35~∞	?	No	No	62	184	2025	China	
Brightin Star	AF50mm F1.4	50	1.4	16	No	9	50-∞	?	No	No	58	450	-	China	
Kase	85mm f/1.4 AF	85	1.4	16	Yes	13	70-∞	0.17x	No	No	72	580	2025	China	FF Design
Laowa	CF 7.5mm f/2.8 C&D-Dreamer AF	7.5	2.8	22	?	?	?	?	No	No	55	?	2026	China	
Laowa	180mm f/4.5 1.5X Ultra Macro APO	180	4.5	22	?	?	?	?	No	No	62	?	2026	China	
Meike	AF 25mm f/1.7 AIR	25	1.7	?	?	?	?	?	No	No	?	?	2026	China	
Meike	AF 33mm F1.4	33	1.4	16	Yes	?	40-∞	?	No	?	55	314	-	China	
Meike	AF 35mm f/1.7 AIR	35	1.7	?	?	?	?	?	No	No	?	?	2026	China	
Meike	AF 55mm F1.4	55	1.4	16	Yes	9	61-∞	?	No	?	52	286	-	China	
Meike	AF 55mm F1.8 Pro	55	1.8	16	Yes	9	55-∞	?	No	?	58	364	-	China	FF Design
Meike	AF 56mm f/1.7 AIR	56	1.7	?	?	?	?	?	No	No	?	?	2026	China	
Meike	AF 85mm F1.8 STM	85	1.8	22	No	9	90-∞	?	No	No	67	386	-	China	FF Design
Meike	AF 85mm F1.8 Pro STM	85	1.8	16	Yes	9	85-∞	0.11x	No	Yes	62	389	-	China	FF Design
Samyang	AF 12mm F2.0	12	2.0	22	No	7	19-∞	0.09x	No	Yes	62	213	-	South Korea	
Samyang	AF 75mm F1.8	75	1.8	22	No	9	69-∞	0.13x	No	Yes	62	257	-	South Korea	
SG-image	AF 18mm F2.2	18	2.2	?	?	?	?	?	No	No	?	?	2026	China	
SG-image	AF 25mm F1.8 STM	25	1.8	16	No	9	30-∞	?	No	No	52	145	June 2025	China	
SG-image	AF 35mm F1.4	35	1.4	?	?	?	?	?	No	No	?	?	2026	China	
SG-image	AF 35mm F2.2 CE	35	2.2	?	?	?	?	?	No	No	?	?	2026	China	FF Design
SG-image	AF 55mm F1.8 STM	55	1.8	16	No	9	?	?	No	No	58	365	?	China	
Sigma	12mm f/1.4 DC DN Contemporary	12	1.4	16	No	9	17.2-∞	0.12x	No	Yes	62	235	?	Japan	
Sigma	16mm f/1.4 DC DN Contemporary	16	1.4	16	No	9	25-∞	?	No	Yes	67	415	?	Japan	
Sigma	23mm f1.4 DC DN Contemporary	23	1.4	?	?	?	?	?	No	Yes	?	?	?	Japan	
Sigma	30mm f/1.4 DC DN Contemporary	30	1.4	16	No	9	30-∞	?	No	No	52	280	?	Japan	
Sigma	56mm f/1.4 DC DN Contemporary	56	1.4	16	No	9	50-∞	?	No	Yes	55	285	?	Japan	
SIRUI	Sniper 16mm F1.2	16	1.2	16	No	13	0.3-∞	?	No	No	58	384	?	China	
SIRUI	Sniper 23mm F1.2	23	1.2	16	No	?	?	?	No	No	?	?	?	China	
SIRUI	Sniper 33mm F1.2	33	1.2	16	No	?	?	?	No	No	?	?	?	China	
SIRUI	Aurora 35mm F1.4 FF AF	35	1.4	16	No	13	?	0.14x	No	No	62	490	?	China	FF design
SIRUI	Sniper 56mm F1.2	56	1.2	16	No	?	?	?	No	No	?	?	?	China	
SIRUI	Sniper 75mm F1.2	75	1.2	16	No	15	0.7-∞	?	No	No	67	466	?	China	
SIRUI	AURORA 85mm F1.4 FF AF	85	1.4	16	No	15	85-∞	?	No	No	67	?	?	China	FF design
Thypoch	Sculptor 23mm f/1.4	23	1.4	16	Yes	?	25-∞	?	No	?	52	?	Winter 2026	China	
Tokina	atx-m 23 1.4 XF	23	1.4	16	Yes	9	30-∞	0.1x	No	No	52	276	Autumn 2020	China	
Tokina	atx-m 33/1.4 XF	33	1.4	16	Yes	9	40-∞	0.1x	No	No	52	285	Autumn 2020	China	
Tokina	atx-m 56/1.4 XF	56	1.4	16	Yes	9	60-∞	0.1x	No	No	52	315	Autumn 2020	China	
TTArtisan	AF 14mm F3.5	14	3.5	16	Yes	7	25-∞	?	No	No	39	98	June 2025	China	
TTArtisan	AF 23mm F1.8	23	1.8	16	No	9	30-∞	?	No	No	52	210	-	China	
TTArtisan	AF 27mm F2.8	27	2.8	16	Yes	7	35-∞	?	No	No	39	-	-	China	
TTArtisan	AF 35mm f/1.8 Mark I	35	1.8	16	No	9	60~∞	?	No	?	52	199	2023	China	
TTArtisan	AF 35mm f/1.8 Mark II	35	1.8	16	No	9	40~∞	?	No	?	62	176	2025	China	
TTArtisan	AF 56mm F1.8	56	1.8	16	No	9	50-∞	?	No	No	52	?	-	China	
TTArtisan	AF 75mm F2	75	2	16	Yes	9	?	?	No	No	62	?	08/2025	China	
Viltrox	AF13/1.4 STM	13	1.4	16	Yes	9	22-∞	0.1x	No	No	67	420	2022	China	
Viltrox	AF 18mm f/1.2 PRO	18	1.2	?	?	?	?	?	?	?	?	?	2026	China	
Viltrox	AF23/1.4 XF	23	1.4	16	Yes	9	30-∞	0.1x	No	No	52	260	15/04/2020	China	
Viltrox	AF25/1.7 XF	25	1.7	?	No	9	?	?	No	No	52	170	-	China	
Viltrox	AF27/1.2 XF Pro	27	1.2	16	Yes	11	28-∞	0.15x	No	No	67	560	01/08/2023	China	
Viltrox	AF28mm/4.5 XF	28	4.5	4.5	No	N/A	?	0.11x	No	No	N/A	60	-	China	Pancake
Viltrox	AF33/1.4 XF	33	1.4	16	Yes	9	40-∞	0.1x	No	No	52	270	15/04/2020	China	
Viltrox	AF 35mm F1.7 Air	35	1.7	?	?	?	?	?	No	No	?	170	-	China	
Viltrox	AF 40mm F1.2 PRO	40	1.2	?	?	?	?	?	?	?	?	?	2026	China	
Viltrox	AF 56mm F1.7 Air	56	1.7	?	?	?	?	?	No	No	?	?	-	China	
Viltrox	AF56/1.4 XF	56	1.4	16	Yes	9	60-∞	0.1x	No	No	52	290	autumn 2020	China	
Viltrox	AF56/1.2 XF Pro	56	1.2	16	Yes	?	?	?	No	No	?	?	09/2025	China	
Viltrox	AF75/1.2 XF Pro	75	1.2	16	Yes	11	90-∞	?	No	No	77	670	28/12/2022	China	
Viltrox	AF 75mm F1.8 EVO	75	1.8	?	?	?	?	?	No	No	?	?	2026	China	
Viltrox	AF85/1.8 II XF	85	1.8	16	No	9	80-∞	0.125x	No	No	52	492	01/07/2020	China	
Viltrox	AF 90mm F2.2 EVO	90	2.2	16	?	?	?	?	No	No	58	?	2026	China	
Yongnuo	YN50mm F1.8X DA DSM	50	1.8	16	No	7	45-∞	?	No	No	49	134	-	China	
Yongnuo	YN50mm F1.8X DA DSM Pro	50	1.8	16	No	9	45-∞	0.15x	No	No	58	387	-	China	
Zeiss	Touit 2.8/12	12	2.8	22	Yes	9	18-∞	0.11x	No	No	67	270	2012	Japan	
Zeiss	Touit 1.8/32	32	1.8	22	Yes	9	37-∞	0.11x	No	No	52	210	2012	Japan	
Zeiss	Touit 2.8/50M	50	2.8	22	Yes	?	15-∞	1x	No	No	52	290	2014	Japan	1:1 Macro

=== Manual lenses ===
Manual lenses usually provide no Exif data transfer, no autofocus, no automatic aperture control, and no lens-based image stabilizer.

Lensbaby lenses

- Velvet 56 f/1.6 macro 1:2
- Velvet 85 f/1.8 macro 1:2
- Burnside 35 f/2.8
- Composer Pro II with Edge 50 f/3.2
- Composer Pro II with Sweet 35 f/2.5
- Composer Pro II with Sweet 50 f/2.5
- Composer Pro II with Sweet 80 f/2.8
- Trio 28 with Filter Kit (28mm f/3.5)
- Circular Fisheye 12mm f/4
- Creative Bokeh Optic 50mm f/2.5

Samyang lenses

Lenses are sold under the interchangeable Samyang, Rokinon, Walimex, and Bower brand names.

Voigtländer lenses

Voigtländer lenses provide Exif data transfer, automatic focus magnification, distance scale and image stabilization information, and parallax compensation for supported X-mount cameras.

Voking by Bilora lenses

BILORA GmbH

- 28 mm f/2.8 pancake
- 35 mm f/1.7
- 50 mm f/2.0

William Optics lens

- RedCat 51 APO 250 mm f/4.9

==== Third Party Manual-focus lens comparison tables ====
Third Party Manual-focus Zoom lenses
Brand	Model name	Min focal length (mm)	Max focal length (mm)	Max aperture	Min aperture	Aperture ring (R)	Nb AP. Blades	Focus Range (cm)	Max mag.	Weather resistant (WR)	Filter thread (mm)	Weight (g)	Date introduced	Made in	Note
Laowa	8-16mm f/3.5-5 Zoom CF	8	16	3.5	16	Yes	5	20-∞	0.125x	-	86	463	01/10/2023	China	-
Laowa	12-24mm f/5.6 Zoom Shift CF	12	24	5.6	22	Yes	9	15-∞	-	-	77	575	-	China	Tilt–shift
Meike	MK-6-11mm f/3.5 Fisheye	6	11	3.5	16	Yes	-	-	-	-	-	-	-	China	Fisheye

Third Party Manual-focus Prime lenses
Brand	Model name	Focal length (mm)	Max aperture	Min aperture	Nb AP. Blades	Focus Range (cm)	Max mag.	Weather resistant (WR)	Filter thread (mm)	Weight (g)	Date introduced	Made in	Note
7artisans	Photoelectric 4mm f/2.8 Circular Fisheye	4	2.8	16	7	8.5-∞	-	No	N/A	201	-	China	Fisheye
7artisans	7.5mm f/2.8 II Fisheye	7.5	2.8	16	7	15-∞	-	No	N/A	265	-	China	Fisheye
7artisans	12mm f/2.8 II	12	2.8	16	5	15-∞	-	No	62	301	-	China	
7artisans	24mm f/1.4	24	1.4	16	9	30-∞	-	No	49	344	-	China	
7artisans	Photoelectric 25mm f/0.95	25	0.95	16	-	-	-	No	-	-	-	China	
7artisans	25mm f/1.8	25	1.8	22	12	18-∞	-	No	46	143	-	China	
7artisans	Photoelectric 35mm f/0.95	35	0.95	16	-	-	-	No	-	-	-	China	
7artisans	35mm f/1.2 II	35	1.8	16	10	28-∞	-	No	46	218	-	China	
7artisans	35mm f/1.4	35	1.4	16	9	37-∞	-	No	49	228	-	China	
7artisans	Photoelectric 50mm f/0.95	50	0.95	16	-	-	-	No	-	-	-	China	
7artisans	Photoelectric 50mm f/1.4 Tilt-Shift	50	1.4	16	12	50-∞	-	No	46	364	-	China	Tilt-Shift
7artisans	50mm f/1.8	50	1.8	16	12	50-∞	-	No	52	167	-	China	
7artisans	55mm f/1.4 II	55	1.4	16	9	42-∞	-	No	52	358	-	China	
7artisans	Photoelectric 60mm f/2.8 Macro Mark II	60	2.8	16	9	175-∞	-	No	49		-	China	1:1 Macro
Artra Lab	OCULILUMEN 7.5mm F2.8 Fisheye	7.5	2.8	22	10	12-∞	-	No	N/A	320	-	China	Fisheye
Artra Lab	OCULILUMEN 10mm F5.6 Fisheye	10	5.6	5.6	10	20-∞	-	No	N/A	120	-	China	Fisheye
Artra Lab	NONIKKOR-MC 11mm F1.8	11	1.8	22	10	-	-	No	62	350	-	China	
Artra Lab	LATALUMEN 12mm F2	12	2	22	10	20-∞	-	No	62	275	-	China	
Artra Lab	NONIKKOR-MC 24MM F1.7	24	1.7	16	10	-	-	No	52	210	-	China	
Artra Lab	NONIKKOR-MC 35mm F1.4 1980's	35	1.4	16	10	35-∞	-	No	52	285	-	China	FF Design
Artra Lab	NOCTY-NONIKKOR 50mm F1.2	50	1.2	16	11	-	-	No	52	560	-	China	
Artra Lab	Motus 50mm f/1.6 Tilt-Shift	50	1.6	16	-	-	-	No	-	-	-	China	±15° Tilt-Shift
Artra Lab	ARTOLUMEN 60mm F2.8 2X Macro	60	2.8	16	10	18.5-∞	2x	No	62	600	-	China	FF Design 2:1 Macro
AstrHori	18mm F8 Macro 2:1 Probe	18	8	28	7	47.4-∞	2x	No	N/A	704	-	China	Probe 2:1 Macro Periscope option
AstrHori	28mm F13 Macro 2:1 Probe	28	13	40	-	-	2x	No	N/A	?	-	China	FF Design Probe 2:1 Macro Periscope option
Brightin Star	7.5mm F2.8 Fisheye	7.5	2.8	22	-	-	-	-	-	-	-	China	Fisheye
Brightin Star	12mm F2.0 III	12	2.0	22	-	-	-	-	-	-	-	China	
Brightin Star	35mm F0.95	35	0.95	16	12	-	-	-	52	370	-	China	
Brightin Star	35mm F1.7	35	1.7	16	-	-	-	-	-	-	-	China	
Brightin Star	50mm F0.95	50	0.95	16	-	-	-	-	-	-	-	China	
Brightin Star	50mm F1.4	50	1.4	16	-	-	-	-	-	-	-	China	
Brightin Star	50mm F1.8	50	1.8	16	-	-	-	-	-	-	-	China	
Brightin Star	60mm f2.8 2x Macro	60	2.8	16	10	-	2x	-	62	300	-	China	2:1 Macro Full Frame Design
KamLan	8mm f/3.0 FISH-EYE	8	3.0	22	?	30-∞	?	No	N/A	245	?	China	Fisheye
KamLan	15mm f2.0	15	2.0	16	?	?	?	No	52	?	?	China	
KamLan	21mm f1.8	21	1.8	16	?	12-∞	?	No	52	?	?	China	
KamLan	28mm f/1.4	28	1.4	16	?	25-∞	?	No	52	?	?	China	
KamLan	32mm f/1.1	32	1.1	11	-	-	-	-	62	603	-	China	
KamLan	50mm f/1.1 MK II	50	1.1	16	11	40-∞	-	-	62	563	2019	China	
KamLan	70mm f/1.1	70	1.1	11	-	-	-	-	77	776	-	China	
Kipon	ELEGANT 24mm/f2.4	24	2.4	16	-	-	-	-	58	-	-	China	
Kipon	ELEGANT 35mm/f2.4	35	2.4	16	-	-	-	-	58	-	2022	China	
Kipon	IBELUX 40mm f0.85 MARK III	40	0.85	22	10	75-∞	0.05x	-	67	1150	-	China	Also HandeVision branded
Kipon	ELEGANT 50mm/f2.4	50	2.4	16	-	-	-	-	58	-	-	China	
Kipon	ELEGANT 75mm/f2.4	75	2.4	16	-	-	-	-	58	-	-	China	
Kipon	ELEGANT 90mm/f2.4	90	2.4	16	-	-	-	-	58	-	-	China	
Laowa	4MM F2.8 210° Circular Fisheye	4	2.8	16		8-∞	0.111x	-		135	-	China	Fisheye
Laowa	9MM F2.8 ZERO-D	9	2.8	22	7	-	0.133x	-	49	215	-	China	
Laowa	10mm f/4 Cookie	10	4	22	5	10-∞	-	-	37	130	-	China	Pancake
Laowa	Argus 25mm f/0.95 CF APO	25	0.95	11	9	34-∞	0.125x	-	62	575	-	China	
Laowa	ARGUS 33MM F0.95 CF APO	33	0.95	11	9	35-∞	-	-		590	-	China	
Laowa	65MM F2.8 2X ULTRA MACRO APO	65	2.8	22	9	17-∞	2x	-	52	335	16/03/2020	China	2:1 Macro
Lensbaby	Velvet 28	28	2.5	22	12	?	?	?	67	?	?	?	
Lensbaby	Velvet 56	56	1.6	16	9	?	0.5x	?	62	?	?	?	1:2 Macro
Lensbaby	Velvet 85	85	1.8	16	12	?	?	?	67	?	?	?	
Meyer-Optik Gorlitz	Lydith 30mm f/3.5 II	30	3.5	22	10	15-∞	-	-	52	-	-	Germany	FF Design
Meyer-Optik Gorlitz	Trioplan 35 f2.8 II	35	2.8	22	12	20-∞	-	-	52	-	-	Germany	FF Design
Meyer-Optik Gorlitz	Trioplan 50 f2.8 II	50	2.8	22	12	40-∞	-	-	52	-	-	Germany	FF Design
Meyer-Optik Gorlitz	Biotar 58mm f/1.5 II	58	1.5	16	14	70-∞	-	-	52	-	-	Germany	FF Design
Meyer-Optik Gorlitz	Primoplan 58 f1.9 II	58	1.9	22	14	50-∞	-	-	52	-	-	Germany	FF Design
Meyer-Optik Gorlitz	Biotar 75 f1.5 II	75	1.5	16	15	75-∞	-	-	62	-	-	Germany	FF Design
Meyer-Optik Gorlitz	Primoplan 75mm f/1.9 II	75	1.9	16	15	75-∞	-	-	52	-	-	Germany	FF Design
Meyer-Optik Gorlitz	Trioplan 100mm f/2.8 II	100	2.8	22	15	89.92-∞	-	-	52	-	-	Germany	FF Design
Meike	MK-6.5mm F2.0	6.5	2	22	?	?	?	?	-	?	?	China	Fisheye
Meike	7.5mm F2.8	7.5	2.8	16	?	15-∞	?	No	-	260	?	China	Fisheye
Meike	10mm F2.0	10	2	22	10	30-∞	?	No	77	550	?	China	
Meike	12mm F2.0	12	2	16	?	20-∞	?	No	62	277	?	China	
Meike	25mm F0.95	25	0.95	16	?	?	?	?	62	?	?	China	
Meike	25mm F1.8	25	1.8	16	?	25-∞	?	?	49	190	?	China	Fisheye
Meike	35mm F0.95	35	0.95	16	13	?	?	?	52	?	?	China	
Meike	35mm F1.7	35	1.7	22	8	?	?	?	49	176	?	China	
Meike	50mm F0.95	50	0.95	16	13	45-∞	?	?	62	420	?	China	
Meike	50mm F1.7	50	1.7	22	?	50-∞	?	No	52	310	?	China	FF Design
Meike	60mm F2.8	60	2.8	22	9	17.5-∞	1x	?	49	300	?	China	1:1 Macro
NiSi	9mm f/2.8 Sunstar ASPH	9	2.8	16	?	?	?	?	67	?	?	China	
NiSi	15mm f/4 Sunstar ASPH	15	4	22	?	?	?	?	72	?	?	China	FF Design
Pergear	7.5mm F2.8 Fish Eye	7.5	2.8	22	-	-	-	-	-	-	-	China	Fish Eye
Pergear	12mm F2 II	12	2	22	-	-	-	-	-	230	-	China	
Pergear	25mm F1.7	25	1.7	22	10	20-∞	-	-	37	165	-	China	
Pergear	25mm F1.8	25	1.8	16	-	-	-	-	-	-	-	China	
Pergear	35mm F1.2	35	1.2	22	10	25-∞	-	-	43	210	-	China	
Pergear	35mm F1.6	35	1.6	16	10	28-∞	-	-	43	193	-	China	
Pergear	50mm F1.8	50	1.8	16	-	-	-	-	-	-	-	China	
Pergear	60mm F2.8 MK2 2X	60	2.8	16	10	19.1-∞	2x	-	62	600	-	China	FF Design 2:1 Macro
SainSonic	Zonlai 22 mm f/1.8	22	1.8	16	11	15-∞	?	No	46	224	?	China	
SainSonic	Zonlai 35mm F1.6	35	1.6	16	10	27-∞	?	No	49	190	?	China	
SainSonic	Zonlai 50mm F1.4	50	1.4	16	?	?	?	No	49	?	?	China	
Samyang	8mm f/2.8 Fish-eye II UMC	8	2.8	22		30-∞	-	-		265	-	South Korea	Fisheye
Samyang	8mm f/3.5 UMC Fish-Eye CS II	8	3.5	22		-	-	-		400	2015	South Korea	Fisheye
Samyang	10mm f/2.8 ED AS NCS CS	10	2.8	22	6	24-∞	-	-		590	2013	South Korea	
Samyang	12mm f/2 NCS CS	12	2	22	6	20-∞	-	-	67	245	-	South Korea	
Samyang	12mm f/2.8 AS NCS	12	2.8	22	7	20-∞	-	-		565	2014	South Korea	
Samyang	14mm f/2.8 ED AS IF UMC	14	2.8	22		-	-	-	87	500	-	South Korea	
Samyang	MF 14mm F2.8 MK2	14	2.8	22	9	28-∞	0.12x	Yes		694	-	South Korea	FF Design
Samyang	16mm f/2 ED AS UMC CS	16	2	22		-	-	-	77		2013	South Korea	
Samyang	20mm f/1.8 ED AS UMC	20	1.8	22		-	-	-	77		-	South Korea	
Samyang	21mm f/1.4 ED AS U	21	1.4	22		-	-	-	58		-	South Korea	
Samyang	24mm f/1.4 ED AS IF UMC	24	1.4	22		-	-	-	77		-	South Korea	
Samyang	T-S 24mm F3.5 ED AS UMC	24	3.5	22		-	-	-	82		-	South Korea	±8.5° Tilt-Shift ±12mm
Samyang	35mm f/1.2 ED AS UMC CS	35	1.2	16		-	-	-	62		-	South Korea	
Samyang	35mm f/1.4 AS UMC	35	1.4	22		-	-	-	77		-	South Korea	
Samyang	50mm f/1.2 AS UMC CS	50	1.2	16		-	-	-	62		-	South Korea	
Samyang	50mm f/1.4 AS UMC	50	1.4	22		-	-	-	77		-	South Korea	
Samyang	85mm f/1.4 AS IF UMC	85	1.4	22		-	-	-	72		-	South Korea	
Samyang	MF 85mm f/1.4 MK2	85	1.4	22	9	110-∞	0.135x	Yes	72	592	-	South Korea	FF Design
Samyang	MF 85mm f/1.8 ED UMC CS	85	1.8	22	9	65-∞	-	No	62		-	South Korea	
Samyang	100mm f/2.8 Macro ED UMC	100	2.8	32		-	1x	-	67		-	South Korea	1:1 Macro
Samyang	135mm f/2 ED UMC	135	2	22	9	80-∞	-	Yes	77	815	-	South Korea	FF Design
SGimage	25mm F1.8	25	1.8	16	7	?	?	No	43	185	?	China	
Thypoch	Simera 28mm f/1.4 Lens	28	1.4	16	14	40-∞	?	No	49	347	?	China	
Thypoch	Eureka 28mm f/2.8	28	2.8	16	?	?	?	?	?	?	?	China	
Thypoch	Simera 35mm f/1.4 Lens	35	1.4	16	?	45.7-∞	?	No	49	297	?	China	
Tokina	SZ 8mm F2.8 X FISH-EYE	8	2.8	22	7	10-∞	-	No	N/A	280	-	Japan	Fisheye
Tokina	SZ 33mm F1.2	33	1.2	16	11	50-∞	-	No	62	605	-	Japan	
TTArtisan	7.5mm F2	7.5	2	11	7	12.5-∞	?	No			-	China	Fisheye. Rear element screw in filter
TTArtisan	10mm F2 ASPH.	10	2	16	8	25-∞	?	No	72	?	-	China	
TTArtisan	17mm F1.4	17	1.4	16	10	20-∞	?	No	40.5	247	-	China	
TTArtisan	23mm F1.4	23	1.4	16	10	20-∞	-	No	43	?	-	China	
TTArtisan	25mm F2	25	2	16	7	25-∞	-	No	43	?	-	China	
TTArtisan	35mm F0.95	35	0.95	16	10	35-∞	?	No	52	?	-	China	
TTArtisan	35mm F1.4	35	1.4	16	10	28-∞	?	No	39	180	-	China	
TTArtisan	40mm F2.8 MACRO	40	2.8	16	11	17-∞	1x	No	52	?	-	China	1:1 Macro
TTArtisan	50mm F0.95	50	0.95	16	10	50-∞	?	No	58	411	-	China	
TTArtisan	50mm F1.2	50	1.2	16	10	50-∞	?	No	52	336	-	China	
Voigtländer	Color-Skopar 18mm F2.8 Aspherical	18	2.8	22	10	17-∞	-	No	43	115	-	Japan	Supports data communication
Voigtländer	Nokton 23mm F1.2 Aspherical	23	1.2	16	12	18-∞	-	No	46	214	-	Japan	Supports data communication
Voigtländer	Ultron 27mm F2	27	2	22	10	25-∞	-	No	43	120	-	Japan	Supports data communication
Voigtländer	Nokton 35mm F0.9 Aspherical	35	0.9	22	12	35-∞	-	No	62	492	-	Japan	Supports data communication
Voigtländer	Nokton 35mm F1.2	35	1.2	16	12	30-∞	0.17x	No	46	196	September 2021	Japan	Supports data communication
Voigtländer	Macro APO-Ultron 35mm F2	35	2	22	10	16.3-∞	0.5x	No	49	265	-	Japan	Supports data communication 1:2 Macro
Voigtländer	Nokton 50mm F1.2	50	1.2	16	12	39-∞	-	No	58	290	-	Japan	Supports data communication
Zhongyi Optics	Mitakon Speedmaster 20mm f/0.95	20	0.95	16	9	0.3-∞	0.08x	No	72	635	24/01/2024	China	
Zhongyi Optics	Mitakon Speedmaster 35mm f/0.95	35	0.95	16	9	35-∞	0.13x	-	55	458	-	China	
Zhongyi Optics	Mitakon Creator 85mm f/2.8 1-5x Super Macro	85	2.8	32	9	22.2-∞	5x	No	58	750	-	China	5:1 Macro

Third Party Fixed-Aperture Prime lenses
Brand	Model name	Focal length (mm)	Aperture	Focus Range (cm)	Max mag.	Weather resistant (WR)	Filter thread (mm)	Weight (g)	Date introduced	Made in	Note
7artisans	18mm f/6.3 II	18	6.3	30-∞	?	No	N/A	58	?	China	Pancake
Artra Lab	OCULILUMEN 10mm F5.6 Fisheye	10	5.6	20-∞	?	No	N/A	120	?	China	Fisheye
AstrHori	10mm F8 I Fisheye	10	8	30-∞	?	No	?	80	?	China	Fisheye
AstrHori	10mm F8 II Fisheye	10	8	?	?	No	58	130	?	China	Fisheye
AstrHori	14mm F4.5	14	4.5	23-∞	?	No	?	?	?	China	Pancake
AstrHori	18mm F5.6 Shift	18	5.6	30-∞	?	No	58	169	09/2025	China	± 6mm Shift
AstrHori	27mm F2.8 II	27	2.8	25-∞	?	No	52	137	?	China	Rockstar
Brightin Star	10mm F5.6 Fisheye	10	5.6	?	?	?	?	?	?	China	Fisheye
Funleader	CAPLENS 18mm f/8.0 Pro	18	8	30-∞	?	No	N/A	71	?	China	Pancake
Funleader	CAPLENS 18mm f/8.0	18	8	80-∞	?	No	N/A	80	?	China	Pancake
Kase	200mm f/5.6 MC Reflex	200	5.6	?	?	?	67	?	?	China	FF Design
Lensbaby	Sweet 22 Optic	22	3.5	?	?	?	46	140	?	?	Pancake
Lensbaby	Twist 28 Pancake	28	3.5	23.3-∞	?	?	?	?	?	?	Pancake
NiSi	250mm f/5.6 Reflex	250	5.6	200-∞	0.14x	No	62	?	?	China	Reflex FF Design
Pergear	10mm F5.6 Pancake Fisheye	10	5.6	15-∞	?	?	?	120	?	China	Pancake Fisheye
Samyang	300mm f/6.3 ED UMC CS	300	6.3	90-∞	?	?	58; 25.5	320	?	South Korea	Reflex lens
Tokina	SZ 300mm PRO Reflex F7.1 MF CF	300	7.1	92-∞	0.4x	No	46; 34	235	?	Japan	-
Tokina	SZX SUPER TELE 400mm F8 Reflex MF	400	8	115-∞	0.4x	No	67	355	?	Japan	FF Design 2X Teleconverter option
Tokina	SZ SUPER TELE 500mm F8 Reflex MF	500	8	170-∞	?	No	72; 30.5	310	?	Japan	FF Design
Tokina	SZ 600mm PRO Reflex F8 MF CF	600	8	177-∞	0.4x	No	77; 34	545	?	Japan	-
Tokina	SZ 900mm PRO Reflex F11 MF CF	900	11	261-∞	0.4x	No	86; 34	725	?	Japan	-

=== Pinhole lenses ===
==== Skink lenses (as of July 2020) ====
- Pinhole Pancake Fujifilm FX 15 mm
- Pinhole Pancake Fujifilm FX 18 mm
- Pinhole Pancake Fujifilm FX 24 mm

==== Thingyfy lenses (as of July 2020) ====
- Thingyfy Pinhole Pro S11; 11 mm
- Thingyfy Pinhole Pro; 26 mm

== Cinema lenses ==
A cinema lens or cine lens, is a specialized optical device designed specifically for motion picture production. Cine lenses are often built for the anamorphic format, and are typically calibrated in T-stops instead of f-numbers.

Additionally cine lenses are known for their superior build quality, smooth operation, consistent apertures, minimal focus breathing, and precise manual controls, making them ideal for cinematographers.

Following video centric camera bodies from Fujifilm, multiple lens manufacturers have produced cine lenses for the X mount.

There are two Fujinon cine zoom lenses. The MKX18-55mm T2.9 and the MKX50-135mm T2.9.

Samyang lenses Lenses are made by Samyang have also been sold under the Rokinon, Walimex, and Bower brand names.

=== Cinema lenses comparison tables ===
Zoom CINE lenses
Brand	Model name	Min focal length (mm )	Max focal length (mm )	Max aperture	Min aperture	Nb AP. Blades	Focus Range (cm)	Max mag.	Filter thread (mm)	Weight (g)	Date introduced	Made in	Note
Fujinon	MKX18-55mm T2.9	18	55	T2.8	22	9	Normal 85-∞ Macro 38-∞	?	82	1100g	2018-02-15	Japan	
Fujinon	MKX50-135mm T2.9	50	135	T2.8	22	9	Normal 120-∞ Macro 85-∞	?	85	1100g	2018-02-15	Japan	
Venus Optics	LAOWA 8-15mm T2.9 FF Zoom Fisheye	8	15	T2.9	22	9	16-∞	0.23x	N/A	590	2025-06		

Prime CINE lenses
Brand	Model name	Focal length (mm)	Max aperture	Min aperture	Squeeze Factor	Nb AP. Blades	Focus Range (cm)	Max mag.	Filter thread (mm)	Weight (g)	Date introduced	Made in	Note
7Artisans	10mm T2.1 S35 Hope	10	T2.1	22	1.0×	?	?	?	77	?	?	China	
7Artisans	12mm T2.9 Vision	12	T2.9	16	1.0×	9	?	?	82	602	?	China	
7Artisans	16mm T2.1 S35 Hope	16	T2.1	22	1.0×	?	?	?	77	?	?	China	
7Artisans	25mm T1.05 Vision	25	T1.05	16	1.0×	?	?	?	82	956	?	China	
7Artisans	25mm T2.1 S35 Hope	25	T2.1	22	1.0×	?	?	?	77	?	?	China	
7Artisans	35mm T1.05 Vision	35	T1.05	16	1.0×	?	?	?	82	753	?	China	
7Artisans	35mm T2.1 S35 Hope	35	T2.1	22	1.0×	?	?	?	77	?	?	China	
7Artisans	50mm T1.05 Vision	50	T1.05	16	1.0×	?	?	?	82	679	?	China	
7Artisans	50mm T2.1 S35 Hope	50	T2.1	22	1.0×	?	?	?	77	?	?	China	
7Artisans	85mm T2.1 S35 Hope	85	T2.1	22	1.0×	?	?	?	77	?	?	China	
IRIX	11mm T4.3	11	T4.3	22	1.0×	?	?	?	N/A	?	?	Korea	FF Design
IRIX	15mm T2.6	15	T2.6	22	1.0×	?	?	?	N/A	?	?	Korea	FF Design
IRIX	21mm T1.5	21	T1.5	16	1.0×	?	?	?	N/A	?	?	Korea	FF Design
IRIX	30mm T1.5	30	T1.5	16	1.0×	?	?	?	86	?	?	Korea	FF Design
IRIX	45mm T1.5	45	T1.5	22	1.0×	?	?	?	86	?	?	Korea	FF Design
IRIX	65mm T1.5	65	T1.5	16	1.0×	?	?	?	86	?	?	Korea	FF Design
IRIX	150mm T3.0 Macro	150	T3.0	32	1.0×	11	35-∞	1x	86	1157	?	Korea	FF Design
IRIX	150mm T3.0 Tele	150	T3.0	22	1.0×	11	67-∞	?	86	1446	?	Korea	FF Design
Laowa	9MM T2.9 ZERO-D CINE	9	T2.9	22	1.0×	7	12-∞	0.133x	?	247	?	China	
Meike	10mm T2.2	10	T2.2	22	1.0×	?	?	?	77	?	?	?	
Meike	25mm T2.2	25	T2.2	22	1.0×	?	?	?	77	?	?	?	
Meike	35mm T2.2	35	T2.2	22	1.0×	?	?	?	77	?	?	?	
Meike	50mm T2.2	50	T2.2	22	1.0×	?	?	?	77	?	?	?	
Meike	65mm T2.2	65	T2.2	22	1.0×	?	?	?	77	?	?	?	
Meike	85mm T2.2	85	T2.2	22	1.0×	?	?	?	77	?	?	?	
Samyang	8mm T3.1 Cine UMC FISH-EYE II	8	T3.1	22	1.0×	?	30-∞	?	N/A	280	?	Korea	
Samyang	8mm T3.8 VDSLR UMC Fish-eye CS II	8	T3.8	22	1.0×	?	30-∞	?	N/A	530	?	Korea	
Samyang	10mm T3.1 VDSLR ED AS NCS CS II	10	T3.1	22	1.0×	?	24-∞	?	N/A	635	?	Korea	
Samyang	12mm T2.2 Cine NCS CS	12	T2.2	22	1.0×	?	20-∞	?	N/A	265	?	Korea	
Samyang	12mm T3.1 VDSLR ED AS NCS FISH-EYE	12	T3.1	22	1.0×	9	20-∞	?	N/A	575	?	Korea	
Samyang	VDSLR 14mm T3.1 MK2	14	T3.1	22	1.0×	9	?	?	N/A	697.4	?	Korea	
Samyang	14mm T3.1 VDSLR ED AS IF UMC II	14	T3.1	22	1.0×	9	28-∞	?	N/A	?	?	Korea	
Samyang	16mm T2.2 ED AS UMC CS II	16	T2.2	22	1.0×	?	20-∞	?	?	625	?	Korea	
Samyang	16mm T2.6 ED AS UMC	16	T2.6	22	1.0×	9	30-∞	?	77	580	?	Korea	
Samyang	20mm T1.9 ED AS UMC	20	T1.9	22	1.0×	9	20-∞	?	77	586	?	Korea	
Samyang	21mm T1.5 ED AS UMC CS	21	T1.5	22	1.0×	?	28-∞	?	?	305	?	Korea	
Samyang	VDSLR 24mm T1.5 MK2	24	T1.5	22	1.0×	9	?	?	77	640	?	Korea	
Samyang	24mm T1.5 VDSLR ED AS IF UMC II	24	T1.5	22	1.0×	9	25-∞	?	77	640	?	Korea	
Samyang	35mm T1.3 AS UMC CS	35	T1.3	16	1.0×	?	38-∞	?	?	?	?	Korea	
Samyang	VDSLR 35mm T1.5 MK2	35	T1.5	22	1.0×	9	?	?	77	776	?	Korea	
Samyang	35mm T1.5 VDSLR AS UMC II	35	T1.5	22	1.0×	9	30-∞	?	77	785	?	Korea	
Samyang	50mm T1.3 AS UMC CS	50	T1.3	16	1.0×	?	50-∞	?	?	390	?	Korea	
Samyang	VDSLR 50mm T1.5 MK2	50	T1.5	22	1.0×	9	?	?	72	567.4	?	Korea	
Samyang	50mm T1.5 VDSLR AS UMC	50	T1.5	22	1.0×	9	45-∞	?	72	640	?	Korea	
Samyang	VDSLR 85mm T1.5 MK2	85	T1.5	22	1.0×	9	?	?	77	603	?	Korea	
Samyang	85mm T1.5 VDSLR AS IF UMC II	85	T1.5	22	1.0×	9	110-∞	?	77	645	?	Korea	
Samyang	100mm T3.1 VDSLR ED UMC MACRO	100	T3.1	22	1.0×	9	30.7-∞	1x	77	775	?	Korea	
Samyang	VDSLR 135mm T2.2 MK2	135	T2.2	22	1.0×	9	?	?	77	912	?	Korea	
Samyang	135mm T2.2 VDSLR ED UMC	135	T2.2	22	1.0×	9	80-∞	?	77	885	?	Korea	
SIRUI	20mm T1.8 1.33X S35 Anamorphic	20	T1.8	22	1.33×	11	40-∞	?	77	480	2025	China	
SIRUI	Night Walker 24mm T1.2 S35	24	T1.2	16	1.0×	?	30-∞	?	67	?	?	China	
SIRUI	24mm F/2.8 Anamorphic 1.33x	24	F2.8	16	1.33×	?	?	?	72	?	?	China	
SIRUI	Night Walker 35mm T1.2 S35	35	T1.2	16	1.0×	?	40-∞	?	67	?	?	China	
SIRUI	Saturn 35mm T2.9 1.6x FF	35	T2.9	16	1.6×	10	90-∞	?	58	418	?	China	FF Design
SIRUI	40mm T1.8 1.33X S35 Anamorphic	40	T1.8	22	1.33×	11	60-∞	?	77	614	December 2024	China	
SIRUI	Saturn 50mm T2.9 1.6x FF	50	T2.9	16	1.6×	10	90-∞	?	62	460	?	China	FF Design
SIRUI	50mm F/1.8 Anamorphic 1.33x	50	F1.8	16	1.33×	?	?	?	67	?	?	China	
SIRUI	Night Walker 55mm T1.2 S35	55	T1.2	16	1.0×	?	60-∞	?	67	?	?	China	
SIRUI	Saturn 70mm T2.9 1.6x FF	70	T2.9	16	1.6×	14	90-∞	?	62	465	?	China	FF Design
SIRUI	SIRUI 75mm F1.8 1.33X Anamorphic	75	F1.8	16	1.33×	13	120-∞	?	67	800	?	China	
SLR Magic	CINE 12mm F2.8	12	F2.8	16	1.0×	9	?	?	62	?	?	?	FF Design
SLR Magic	CINE 18mm F2.8	18	F2.8	16	1.0×	9	?	?	62	?	?	?	FF Design
SLR Magic	CINE 35mm F1.2	35	F1.2	16	1.0×	13	?	?	52	?	?	?	FF Design
SLR Magic	35mm T0.95 Mark II	35	T0.95	16	1.0×	?	?	?	62	?	?	?	
SLR Magic	35mm T1.4 Mark II	35	T1.4	16	1.0×	?	?	?	52	?	?	?	
SLR Magic	HyperPrime 50mm T0.95	50	T0.95	16	1.0×	12	?	?	62	?	?	?	
SLR Magic	CINE 50mm F1.1 II	50	F1.1	16	1.0×	13	?	?	52	?	?	?	FF Design
TTArtisan	35mm T2.1 Dual-Bokeh	35	T2.1	22	1.0×	11	28-∞	?	82	669	April 2025	China	

== Bayonet adaptors (August 2019) ==
Full frame Lenses with various bayonets can be mounted to Fuji X-mount bodies with suitable adaptors. A multitude of adaptors are available from brands like K&F Concept, Fringer, Kipon, Mitakon Zhongyi, Novoflex, Viltrox.

Beyond multiple passive adaptors (manual operation only, no Exif data transfer), there are active ones available to mount Canon EF lens mount lenses to Fuji X-mount.

- Fringer EF-FX and EF-FX Pro II
- Viltrox EF-FX1

== See also ==
- Fujica X-mount
