= Fujifilm X-M5 =

2024 mirrorless camera model

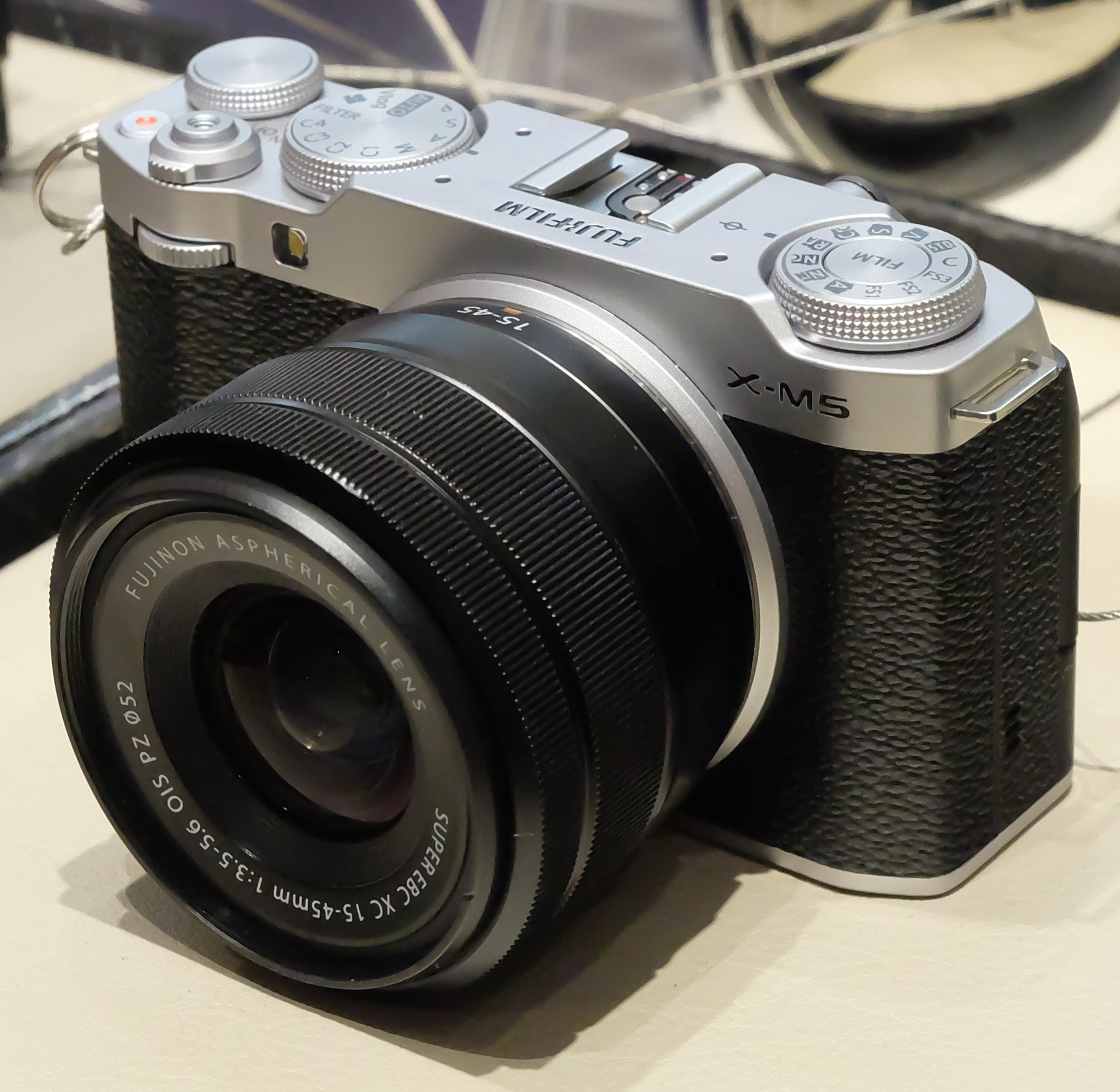
- Fujifilm X-M5 + XC15mm-45mm f3.5-5.6 OIS PZ

Overview
- Maker: Fujifilm
- Type: MILC
- Released: 28 November 2024; 21 months ago
- Intro price: US$799 ¥136,400 (body only)

Lens
- Lens mount: Fujifilm X
- Lens: Interchangeable lens
- Compatible lenses: Fujinon

Sensor/medium
- Sensor: APS-C
- Sensor type: X-Trans CMOS 4
- Sensor size: 23.5 mm × 15.6 mm
- Sensor maker: Sony
- Maximum resolution: 26.1 megapixels 6240 x 4160
- Film speed: 160–12800 (standard); 80–51200 (extend)
- Storage media: SD, SDHC, SDXC, UHS-I

Focusing
- Focus: Intelligent Hybrid AF; TTL contrast AF / TTL phase detection AF
- Focus modes: Single point, Zone, Wide/Tracking

Flash
- Flash: External flash
- Compatible flashes: TTL Flash compatible

Shutter
- Shutter: Focal Plane Shutter
- Image processor: X-Processor 5

General
- Video recording: 6.2K, 4K, 1080p
- LCD screen: 3.0" 1.84M dots (3:2. 720x480) touchscreen free-angle monitor
- Battery: NP-W126S Li-ion (USB rechargeable)
- AV port(s): HDMI D, ⌀3.5mm audio jack for mic & headphone
- Data port: USB-C 3.2, Wi-Fi 5, Bluetooth 4.2
- Dimensions: 119 mm × 66.6 mm × 38 mm (4.69 in × 2.62 in × 1.50 in)
- Weight: 355 g (13 oz) (0.783 lb) including battery and memory card
- Made in: PR China

Chronology
- Predecessor: Fujifilm X-M1; Fujifilm X-S20 (Related)

The Fujifilm X-M5 is a digital compact mirrorless camera by Fujifilm. The camera was announced on 14 October 2024, and was released in November 2024. It is part of the company's X-series range of cameras positioned for enthusiast photographers.

The Fujifilm X-M5 is a reintroduction of the small M-subvariant that does not have any EVF. The camera is based the same the 26.1-megapixel X-Trans CMOS 4 sensor image sensor and X-Processor 5 found in the mid-range Fujifilm X-S20, however lacks features such as the previously mentioned EVF and IBIS. At the time of release, the camera is the smallest offering in the Fujifilm X-series lineup.

== Key features ==
- 26MP APS-C sensor with X-Trans color filter array
- Extremely small size
- Records in 6.2k open gate at 30fps or 4k cropped at 60fps
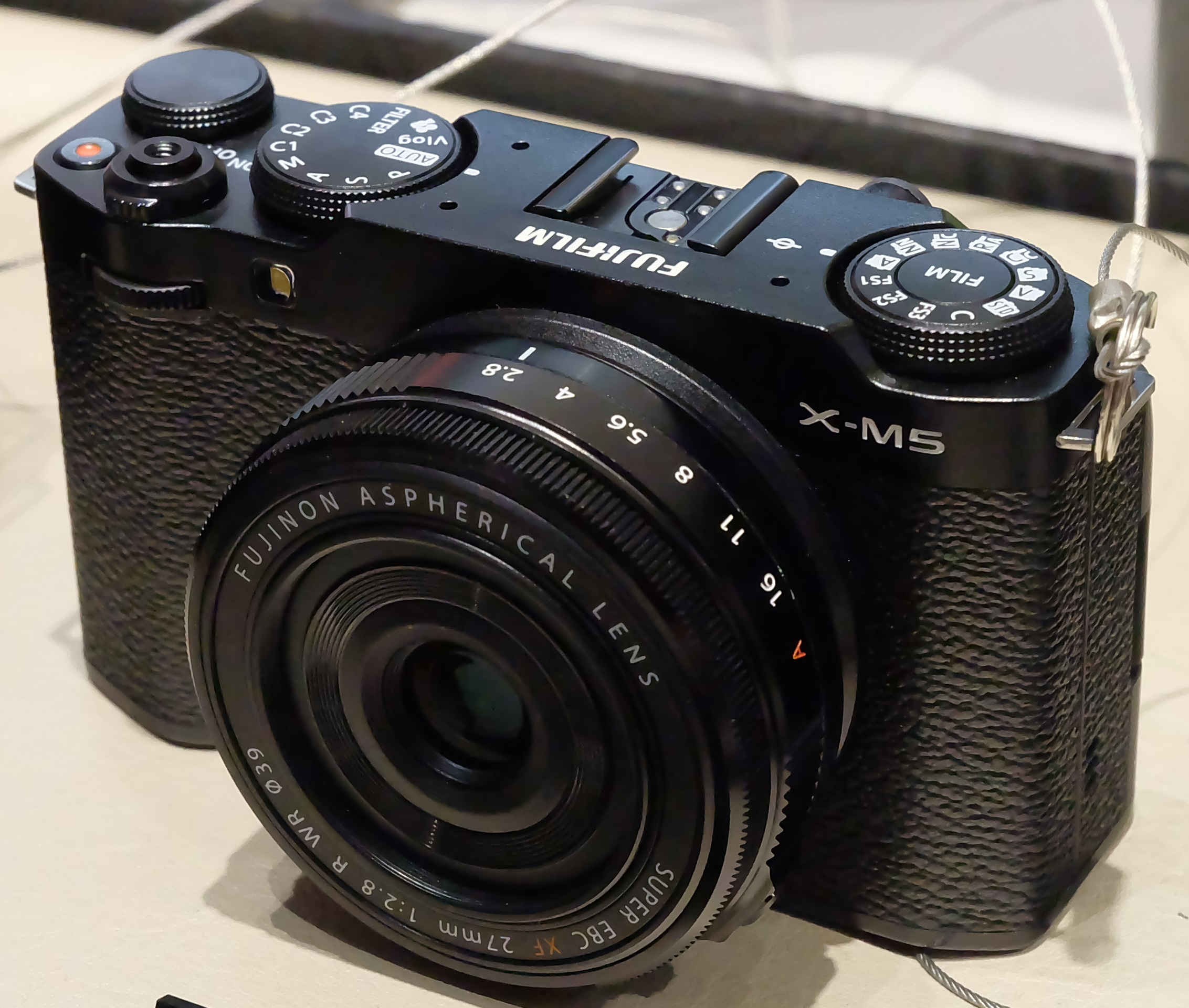

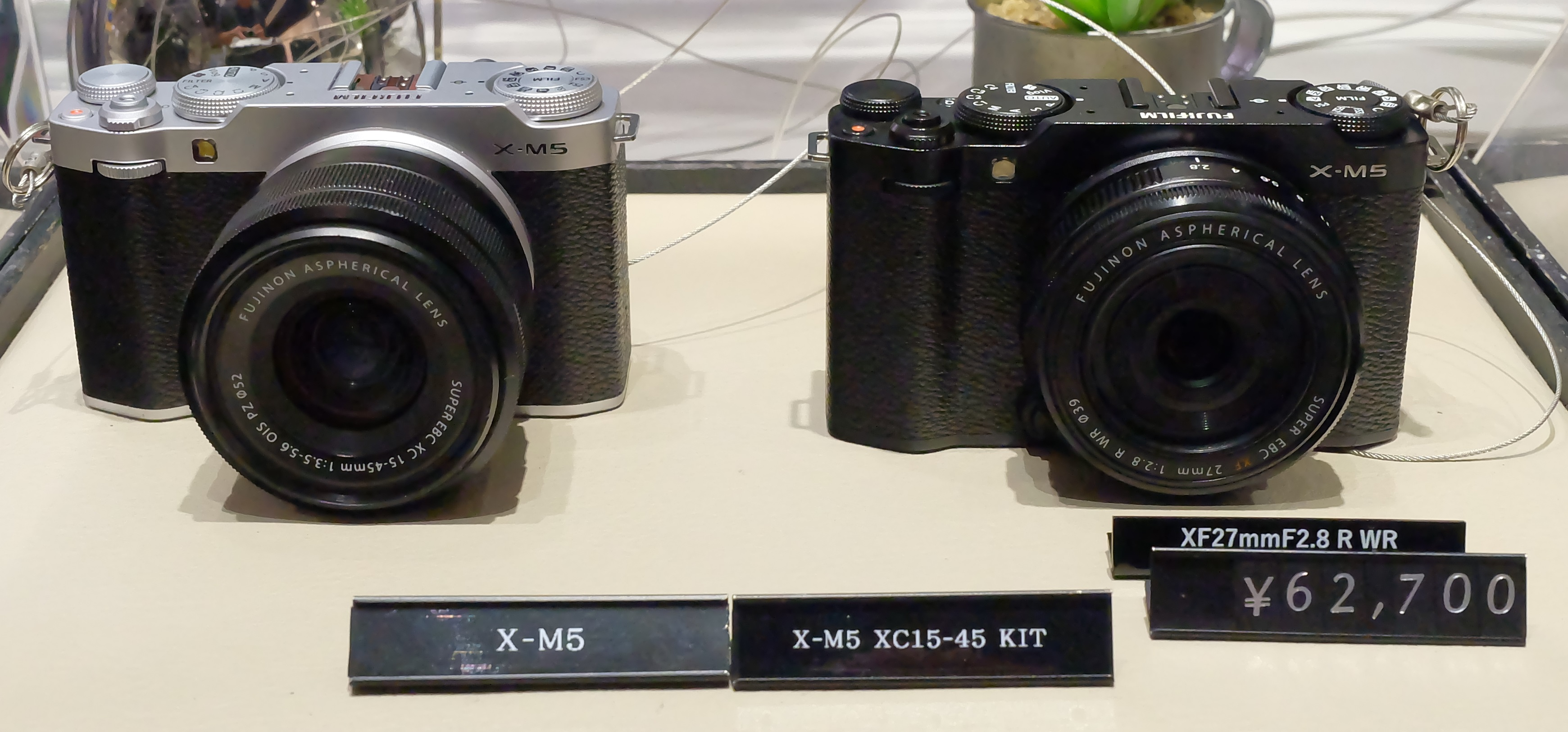

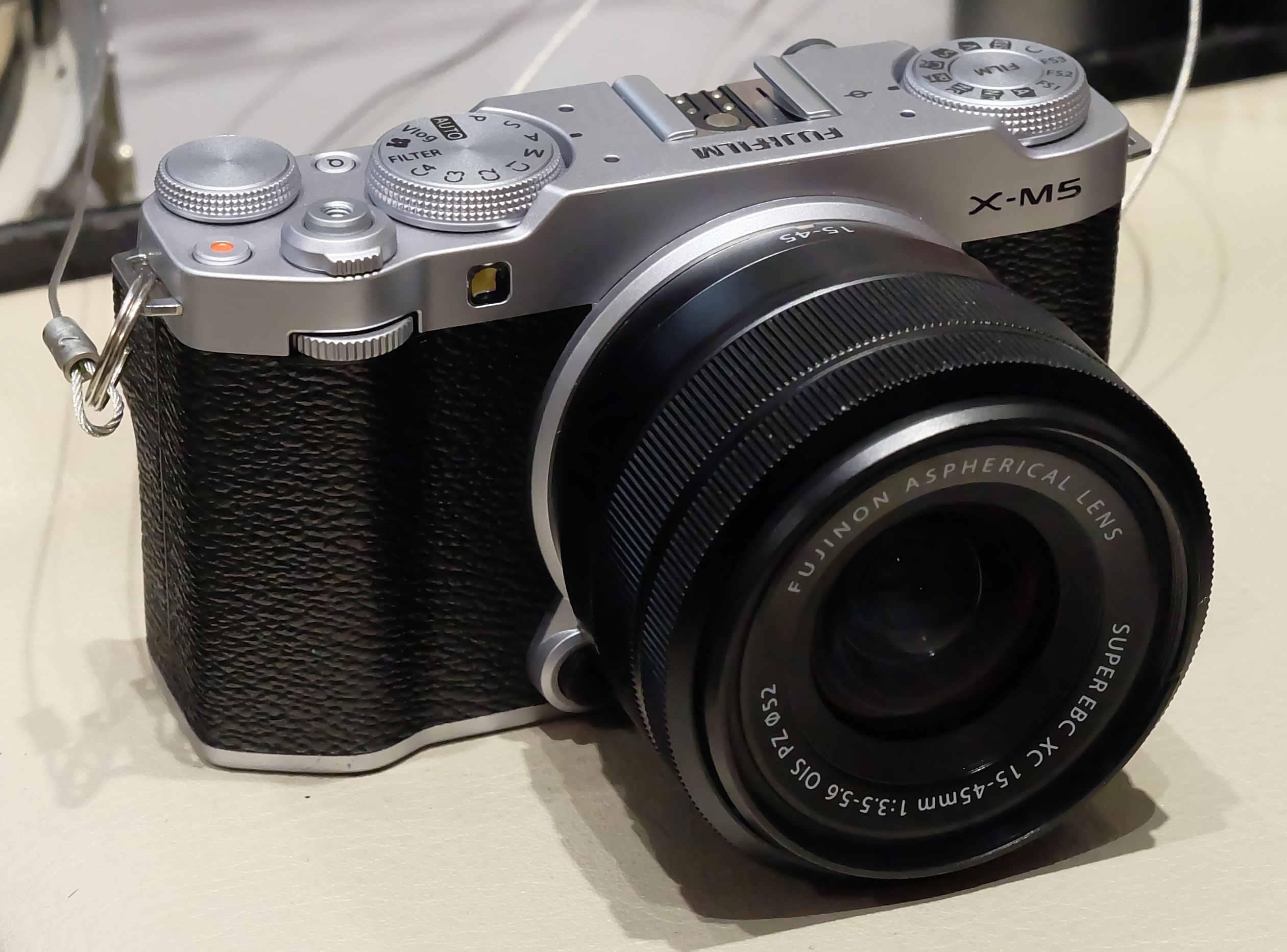

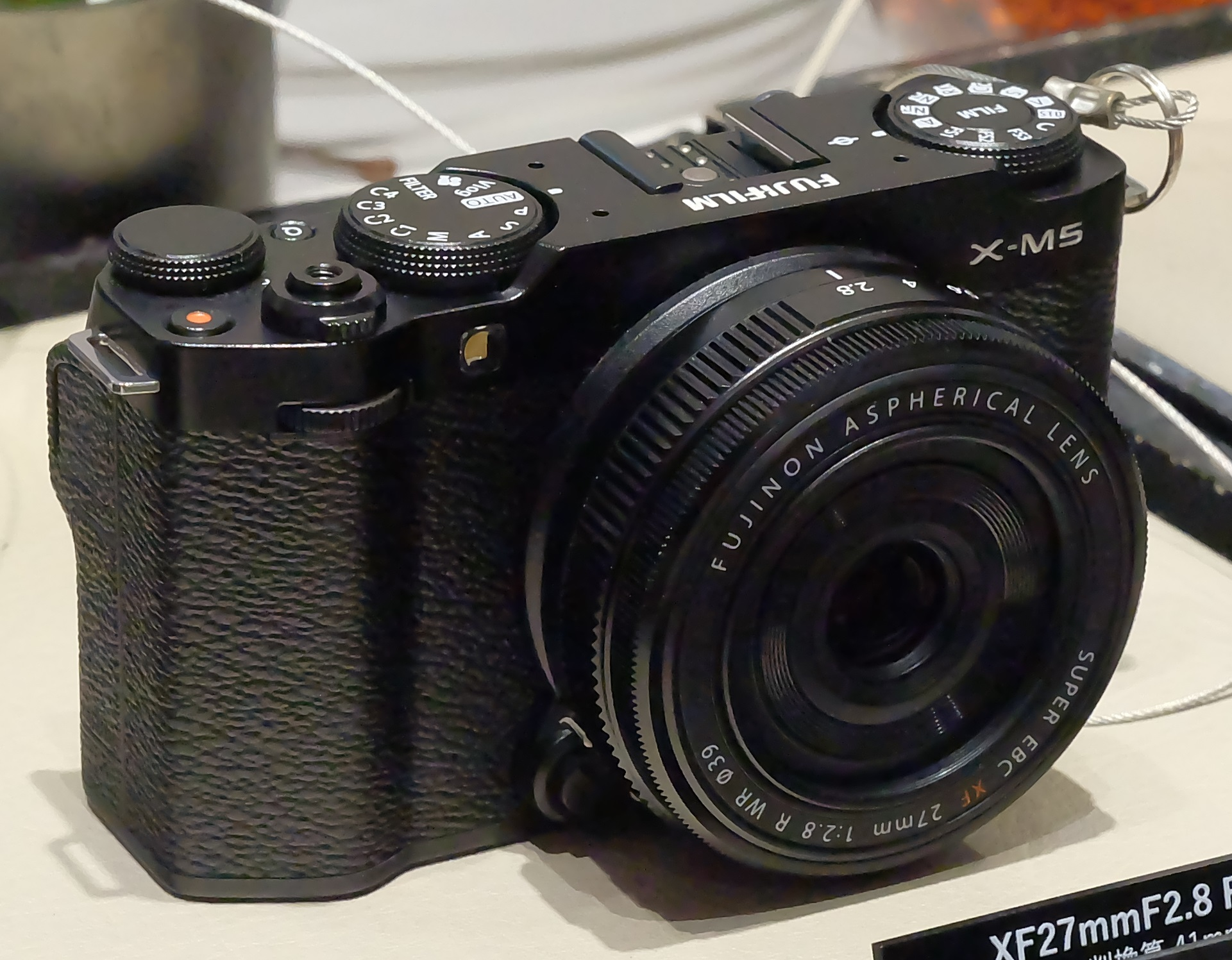

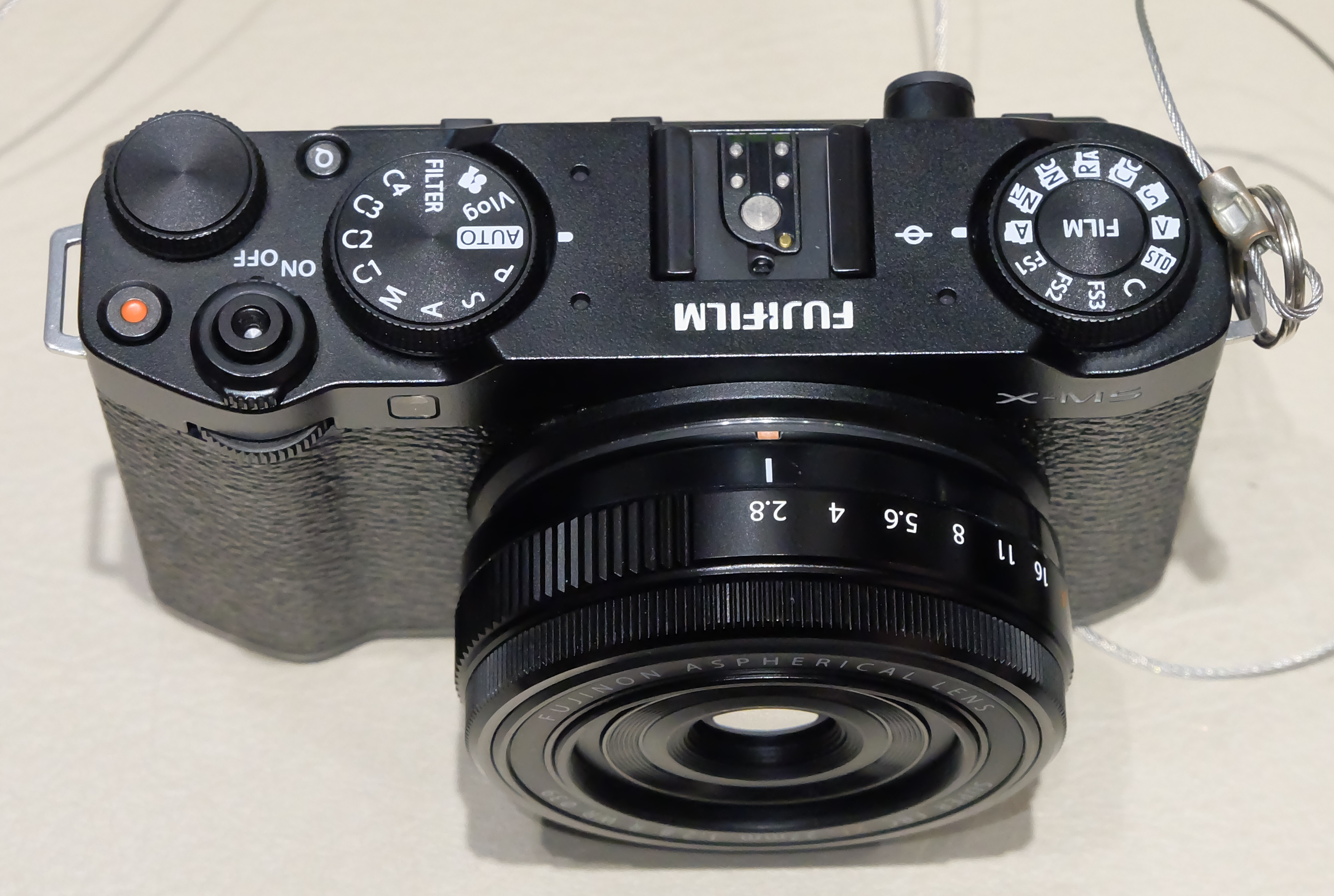

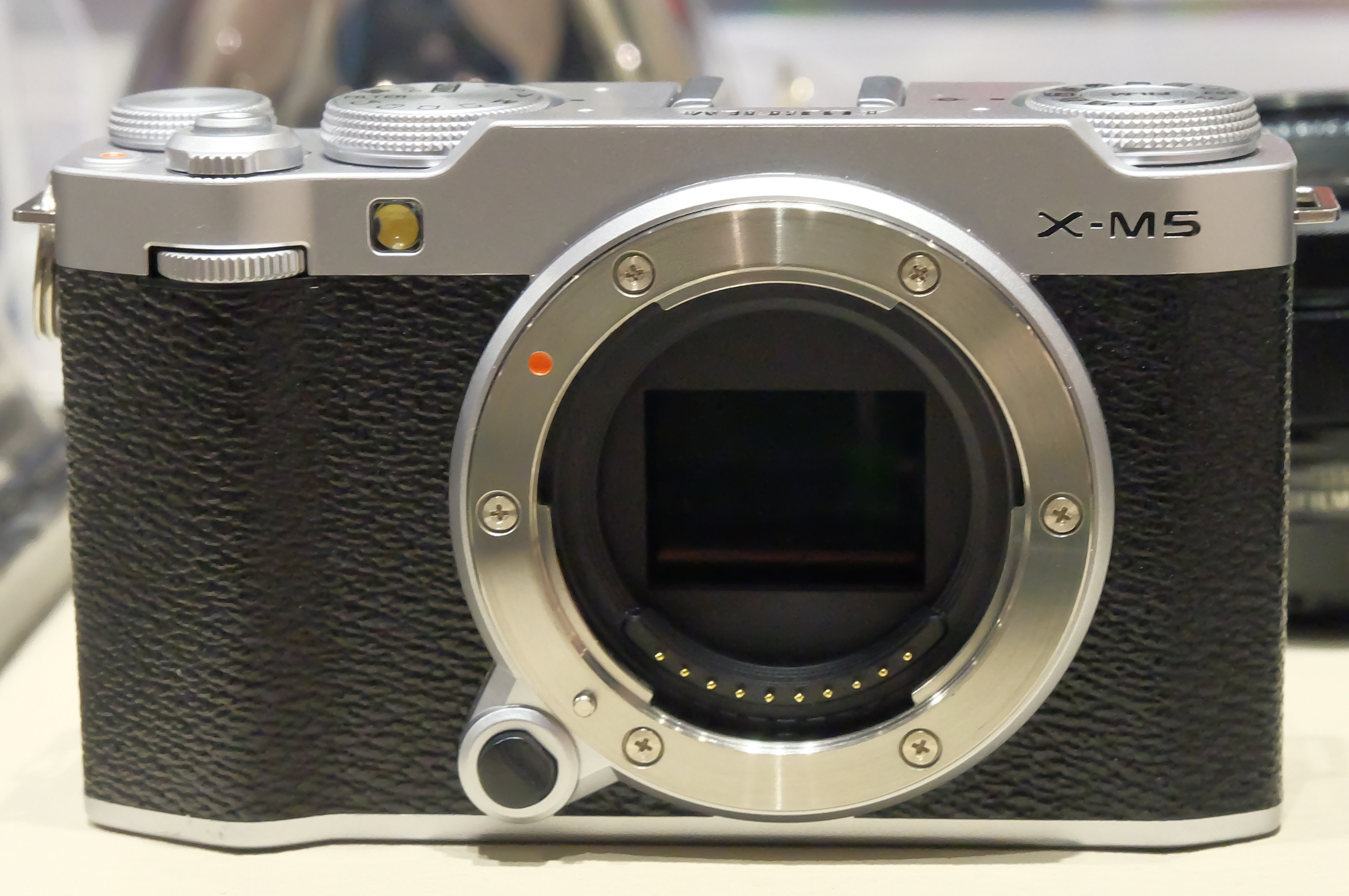

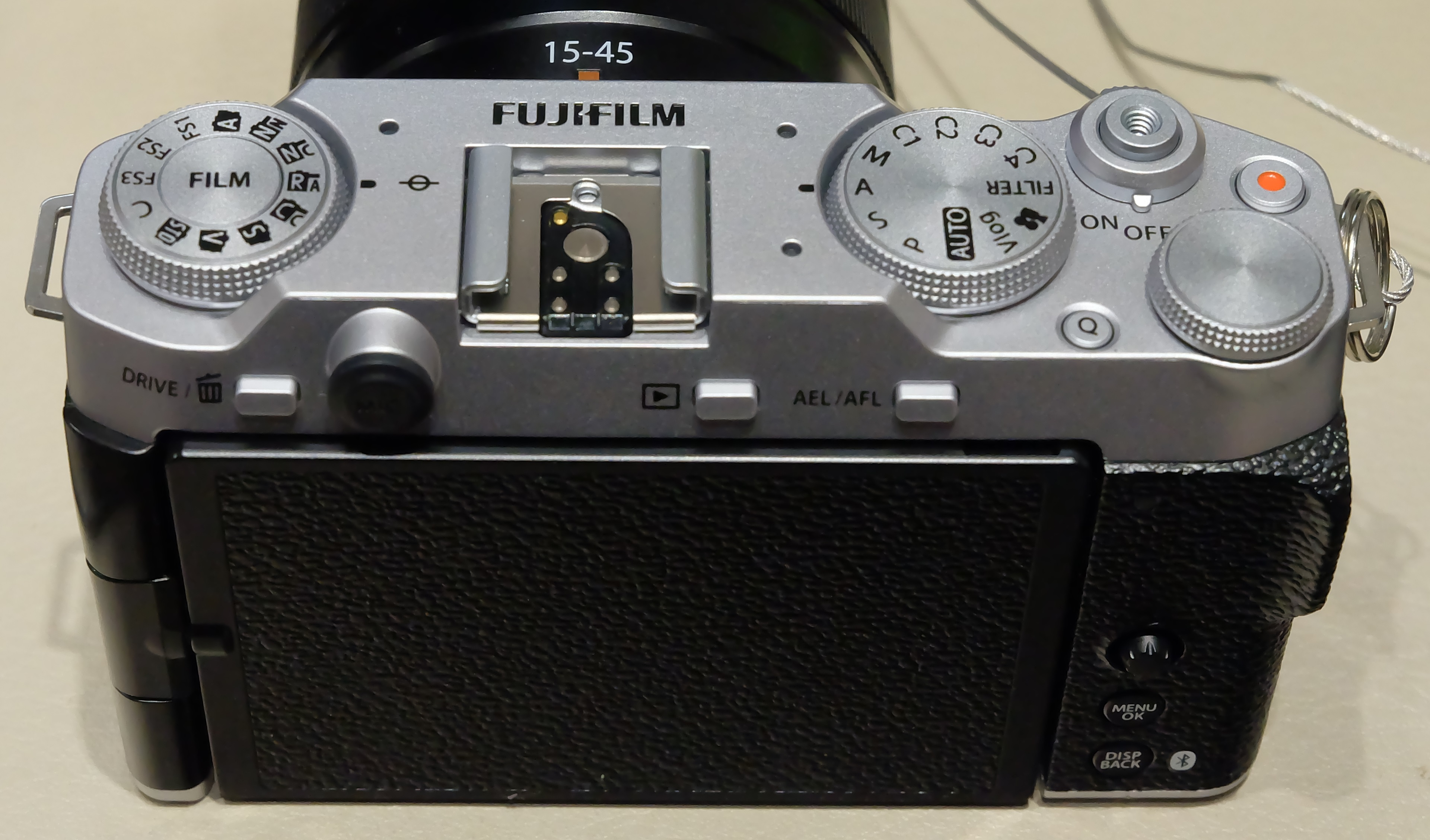

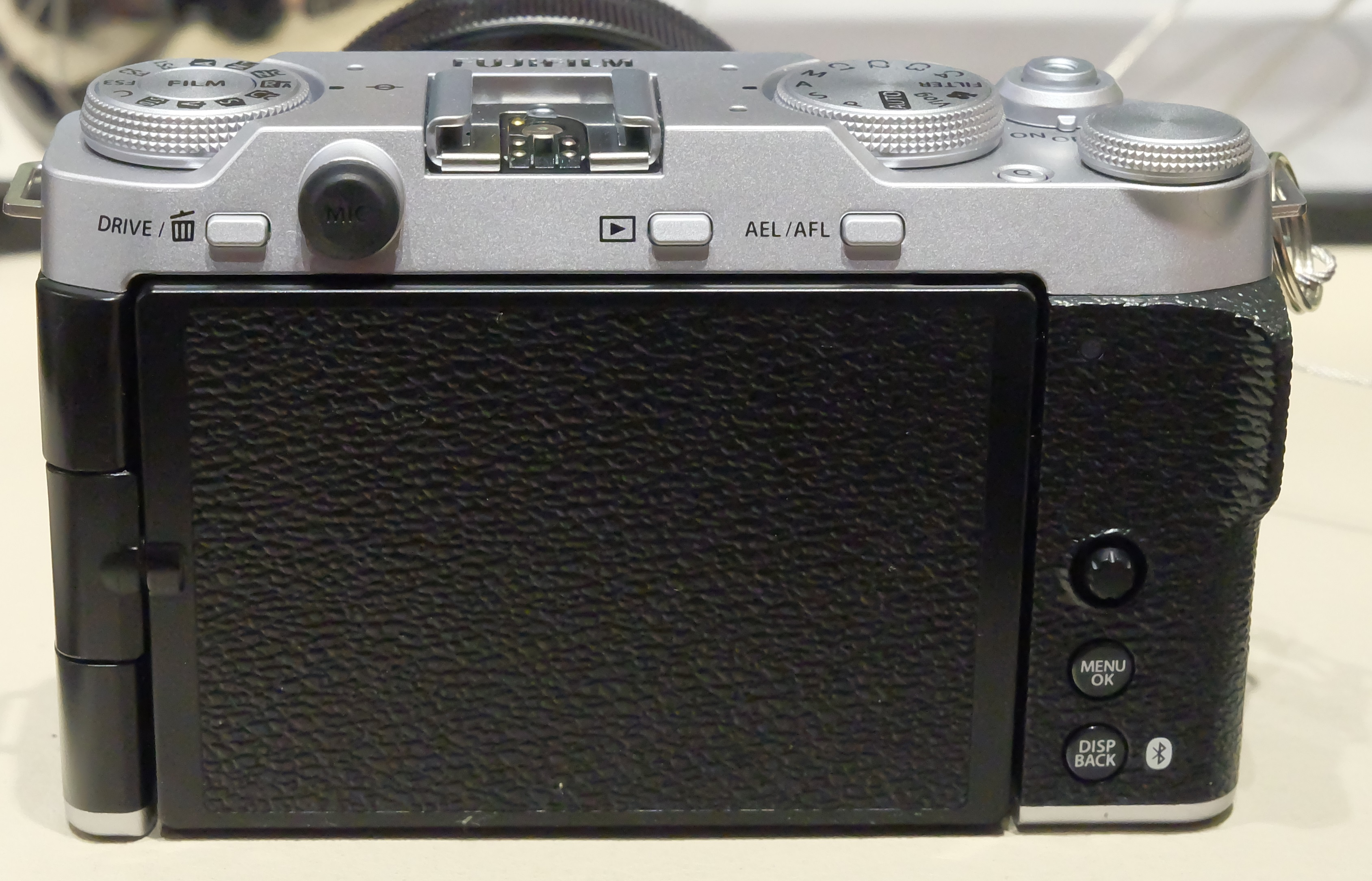

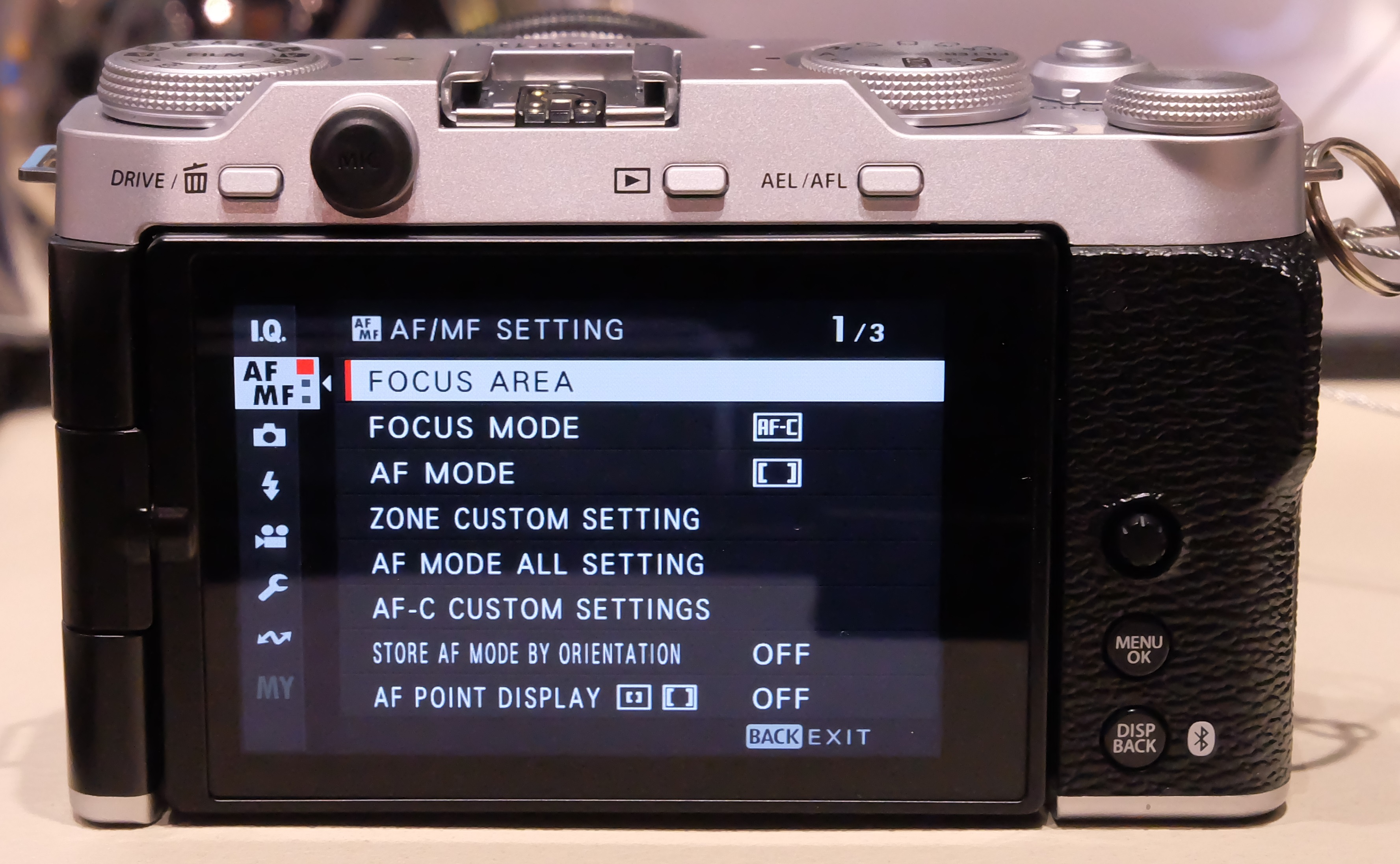

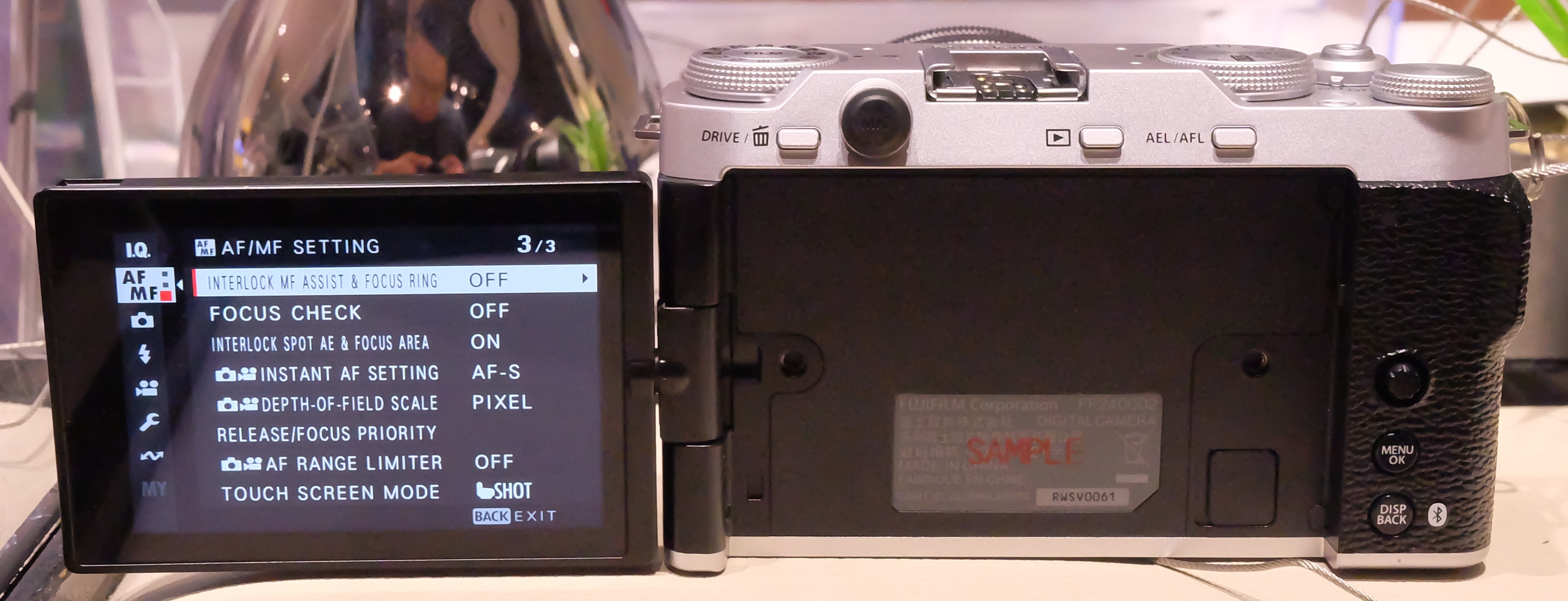

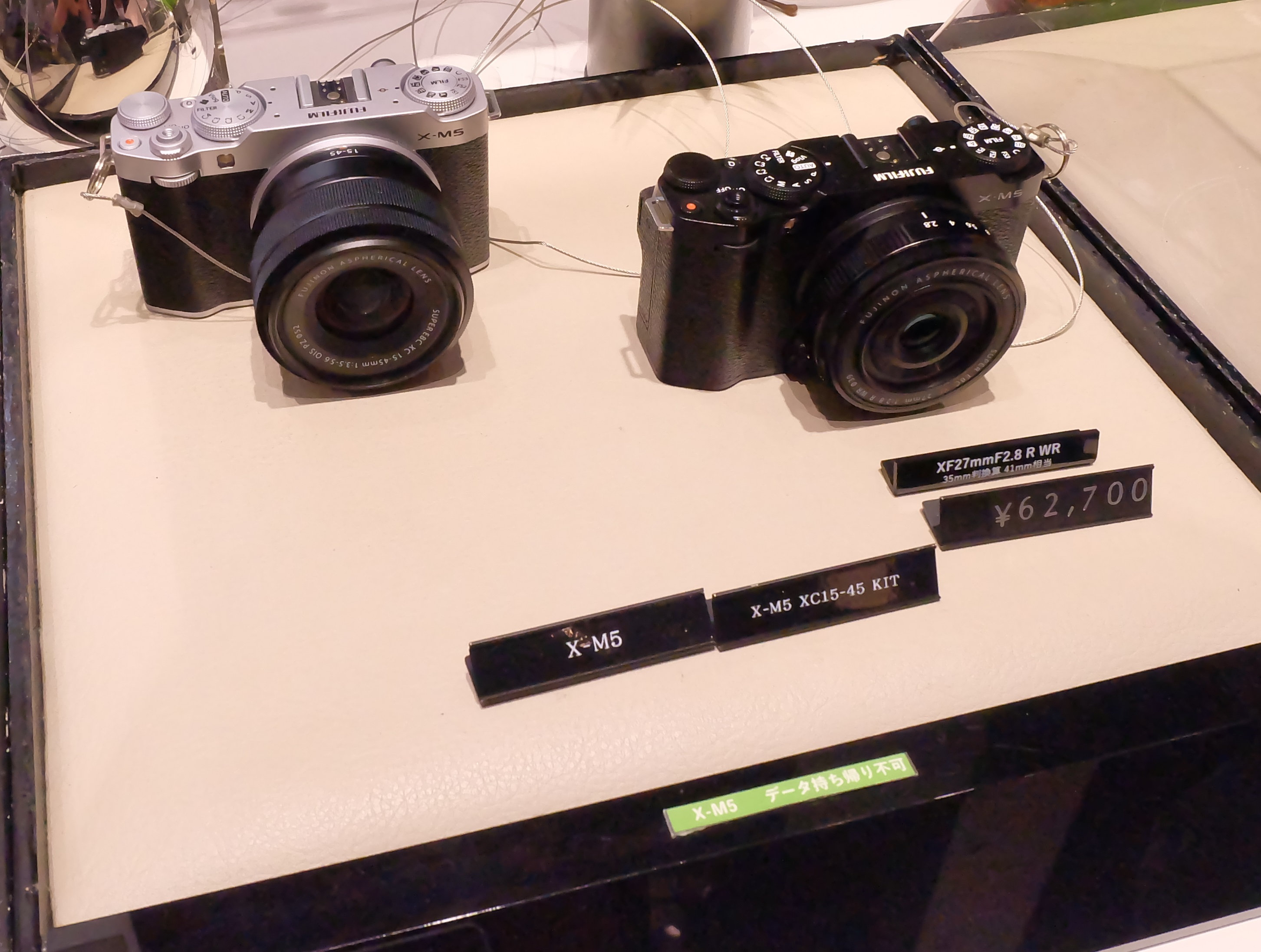

== See also ==
- Fujifilm X series
- Fujifilm cameras
- List of retro-style digital cameras

Type	Lens	2011	2012	2013	2014	2015	2016	2017	2018	2019	2020	2021	2022	2023	2024	2025	2026
MILC	G-mount; Medium format sensor							GFX 50S ^{F} ^{T}					GFX 50S II ^{F} ^{T}				
MILC	G-mount; Medium format sensor									GFX 50R ^{F} ^{T}							
MILC	G-mount; Medium format sensor										GFX 100 ^{F} ^{T}					GFX 100 II ^{F} ^{T}	
MILC	G-mount; Medium format sensor											GFX 100 IR ^{F} ^{T}					
MILC	G-mount; Medium format sensor											GFX 100S ^{F} ^{T}				GFX 100S II ^{F} ^{T}	
MILC	G-mount; Medium format sensor															GFX Eterna 55 ^{F} ^{T}	
MILC	Prime lens Medium format sensor															GFX 100RF ^{F} ^{T}	
MILC	X-mount; APS-C sensor		X-Pro1				X-Pro2				X-Pro3 ^{f} ^{T}						
MILC	X-mount; APS-C sensor								X-H1 ^{F} ^{T}					X-H2 ^{A} ^{T}			
MILC	X-mount; APS-C sensor													X-H2S ^{A} ^{T}			
MILC	X-mount; APS-C sensor											X-S10 ^{A} ^{T}			X-S20 ^{A} ^{T}		
MILC	X-mount; APS-C sensor				X-T1 ^{f}			X-T2 ^{F}		X-T3 ^{F} ^{T}		X-T4 ^{A} ^{T}		X-T5 ^{F} ^{T}			
MILC	X-mount; APS-C sensor															X-T50 ^{f} ^{T}	
MILC	X-mount; APS-C sensor						X-T10 ^{f}	X-T20 ^{f} ^{T}		X-T30 ^{f} ^{T}			X-T30 II ^{f} ^{T}			X-T30 III ^{f} ^{T}	
MILC	X-mount; APS-C sensor									_{15} X-T100 ^{F} ^{T}	X-T200 ^{A} ^{T}						
MILC	X-mount; APS-C sensor			X-E1	X-E2		X-E2s		X-E3 ^{T}			X-E4 ^{f} ^{T}				X-E5 ^{f} ^{T}	
MILC	X-mount; APS-C sensor				X-M1 ^{f}											X-M5 ^{A} ^{T}	
MILC	X-mount; APS-C sensor				X-A1 ^{f}	X-A2 ^{f}		X-A3 ^{f} ^{T}	_{15} X-A5 ^{f} ^{T}		X-A7 ^{A} ^{T}						
MILC	X-mount; APS-C sensor							X-A10 ^{f}	X-A20 ^{f} ^{T}								
Compact	Prime lens APS-C sensor	X100		X100S		X100T		X100F			X100V ^{f} ^{T}				X100VI ^{f} ^{T}		
Compact	Prime lens APS-C sensor						X70 ^{f} ^{T}			XF10 ^{T}							
Compact	Prime lens 1" sensor															X half ^{T}	
Compact	Zoom lens^{2}/_{3}" sensor		X10	X20		X30 ^{f}											
Compact	Zoom lens^{2}/_{3}" sensor				XQ1	XQ2											
Compact	Zoom lens^{2}/_{3}" sensor			XF1													
Bridge	^{2}/_{3}" sensor		X-S1 ^{f}														
Type	Lens																
Type	Lens	2011	2012	2013	2014	2015	2016	2017	2018	2019	2020	2021	2022	2023	2024	2025	2026
