= Fujifilm X-S10 =

2020 APS-C mirrorless camera

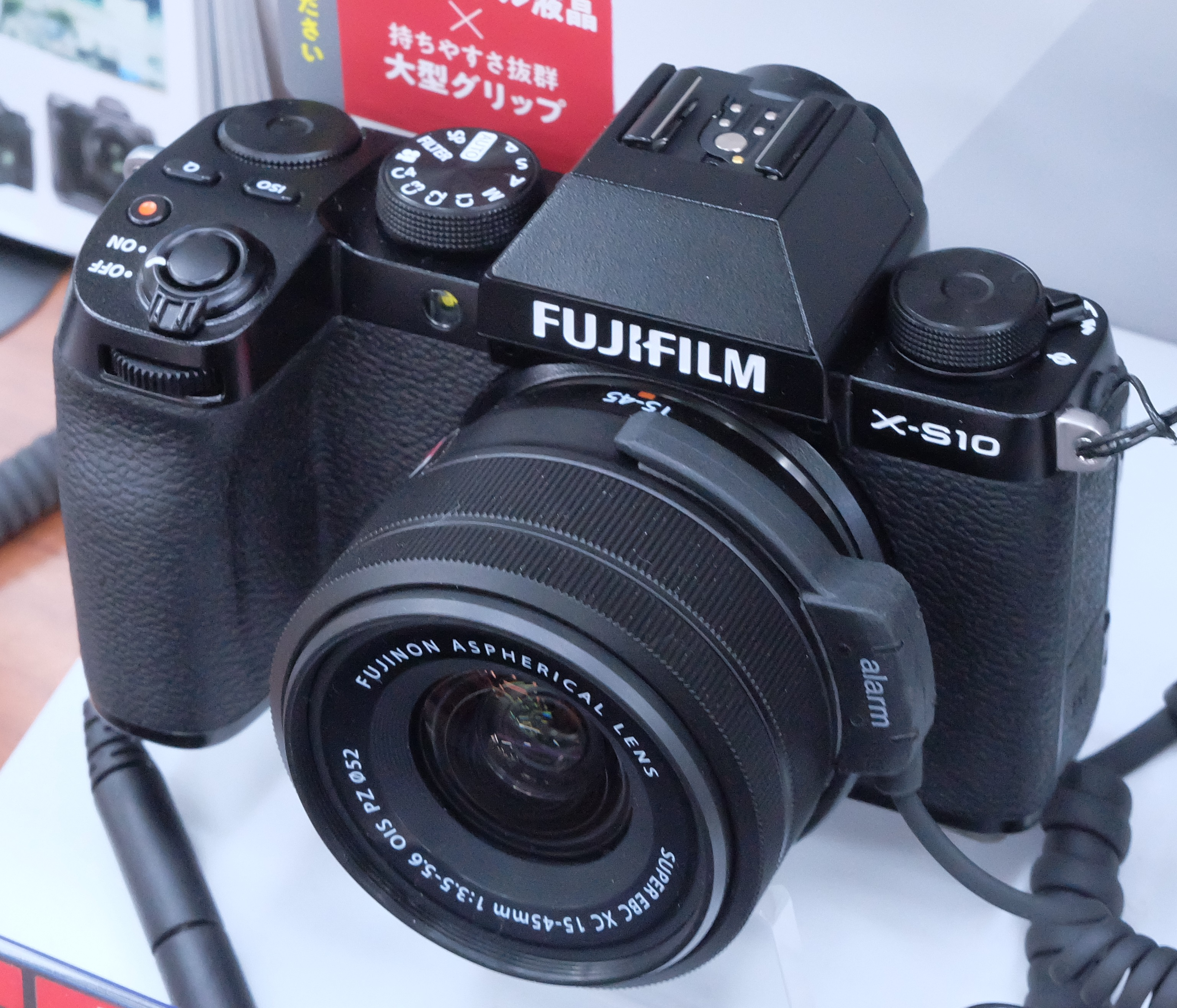
- X-S10 + XC15mm-45mm f3.5-5.6 OIS PZ

Overview
- Maker: Fujifilm
- Type: MILC
- Released: November 19, 2020; 5 years ago
- Production: 2020-2024
- Intro price: USD 1000 (body), USD 1400 (18-55mm kit), USD 1500 (16-80mm kit)

Lens
- Lens mount: Fujifilm X
- Lens: Interchangeable lens
- Compatible lenses: Fujinon

Sensor/medium
- Sensor: APS-C
- Sensor type: X-Trans CMOS 4
- Sensor size: 23.5 mm × 15.6 mm
- Sensor maker: Sony
- Maximum resolution: 26.1 megapixels 6240 x 4160
- Film speed: 160–12800 (standard); 80–51200 (extended)
- Storage media: SD, SDHC, SDXC, UHS-I

Focusing
- Focus: Intelligent Hybrid AF; TTL contrast AF / TTL phase detection AF
- Focus modes: Single point, Zone, Wide/Tracking, All
- Focus areas: 91 focus point
- Focus bracketing: Frames: 1 - 999, Step: 1-10, Interval: 0 - 10s

Exposure/metering
- Exposure: TTL 256-zone metering
- Exposure bracketing: AE Bracketing (Frames: 2, 3, 5, 7, 9; Step: 1/3EV step adjustment, up to ±5EV on stills, ±2EV on video)
- Exposure modes: Program AE, Aperture Priority AE, Shutter Speed Priority AE, Manual Exposure
- Exposure metering: Through-the-lens
- Metering modes: Multi, Spot, Average, Center Weighted

Flash
- Flash: Manual pop-up flash
- Flash synchronization: 1/180 s
- Compatible flashes: TTL Flash compatible

Shutter
- Shutter: Focal Plane Shutter
- Shutter speeds: 4 s to 1/4000 s (mechanical), 4 s to 1/32000 s (electronic)
- Continuous shooting: 8.0 fps (mechanical); 20.0 fps(electronic); 30.0 fps (electronic 1.25x crop)

Viewfinder
- Viewfinder: EVF viewfinder with eye sensor
- Electronic viewfinder: 0.39" 2.36M dots (3:2. 1080x720) OLED
- Viewfinder magnification: 0.62x with 50 mm lens (35 mm format equivalent)
- Frame coverage: 100%

Image processing
- Image processor: X-Processor 4
- White balance: Auto, Custom, Preset, Fluorescent, Incandescent, Underwater
- WB bracketing: ±1, ±2, ±3,
- Dynamic range bracketing: AUTO, 100%, 200%, 400%

General
- Video recording: H.264 8bit 4:2:0 MP4, MOV; 10-bit 4:2:2 on output to HDMI; 4K up to 30 fps, 1080p up to 240 fps
- LCD screen: 3.0" 1.04M dots (3:2. 720x480) touchscreen free-angle monitor
- Battery: NP-W126S Li-ion
- AV port(s): HDMI D, ⌀3.5 mm audio jack
- Data port: USB-C 3.2, Wi-Fi 4, Bluetooth 4.2
- Body features: In-Body Image Stabilization, Magnesium alloy body with a leather wrap
- Dimensions: 126 mm × 85.1 mm × 65.4 mm (4.96 in × 3.35 in × 2.57 in)
- Weight: 465 g (16 oz) (1.025 lb) including battery and memory card
- Made in: China

Chronology
- Successor: Fujifilm X-S20

The Fujifilm X-S10 is a mid-range mirrorless interchangeable-lens camera announced on October 15, 2020. It has a backside-illuminated X-Trans CMOS 4 APS-C sensor, an X-Processor 4 quad core processor, in-body image stabilization (IBIS) and uses the Fujifilm X-mount. The X-S10 is proposed as a hybrid camera aimed at still photographers, video shooters and vloggers, given its vlogger friendly features. It bears little relation to the Fujifilm X-S1 bridge camera released in 2011.

The camera is capable of recording video in 4K resolution at 30 fps. It can be purchased as the camera body only or combined with the 18-55mm f/2.8-4 or 16-80 f/4 lens. The camera is styled after an SLR camera and comes only in black color.

The X-S10 is the first in a new line of cameras. It was succeeded by the Fujifilm X-S20 in May 2023, And in 2024 has been discontinued.

== Key features ==
- In-Body Image Stabilization, capable of up to 6.0 stops
- X-Trans IV CMOS sensor
- Quad Core X-Processor 4
- 26.1 megapixels
- 23.5 mm x 15.7 mm CMOS sensor (APS-C).
- Fully-articulate touchscreen
- 14bit RAW image capture (6240 × 4160)
- Panorama capture, vertical (2160 × 9600) & horizontal (9600 × 1440)
- 4K(3840x2160, 16:9) and DCI 4K(4096x2160, 17:9) video up to 30 fps, and FHD video recording up to 240 fps
- 18 Film Simulation modes
- Wi-Fi and Bluetooth connectivity
- USB-C, HDMI-D, 3.5mm audio jack
- Large grip
- Pop-up flash
- PASM mode dial, front and rear command dials, and film simulation selection dial

== Details ==
The X-S10 looks similar to a smaller version of the X-H1. Its feature set and image quality is very similar to the X-T30. Primary differences are that it introduces a new body design and control layout (PASM mode dial instead of individual dials for shutter speed and ISO), along with in-body stabilization, a flip-out display and more.

The camera's five-axis in-body image stabilization system is smaller and lighter than that of the X-T4.

The X-S10 is equipped with a joystick instead of a directional pad similar to Fujifilm's latest releases. Its LCD screen is fully articulated, similar to the X-T4 and X-T200. It contains a 3.5mm audio jack, a micro HDMI port and a USB-C connection.

Fujifilm X-S10 has a deep grip similar to X-H1.

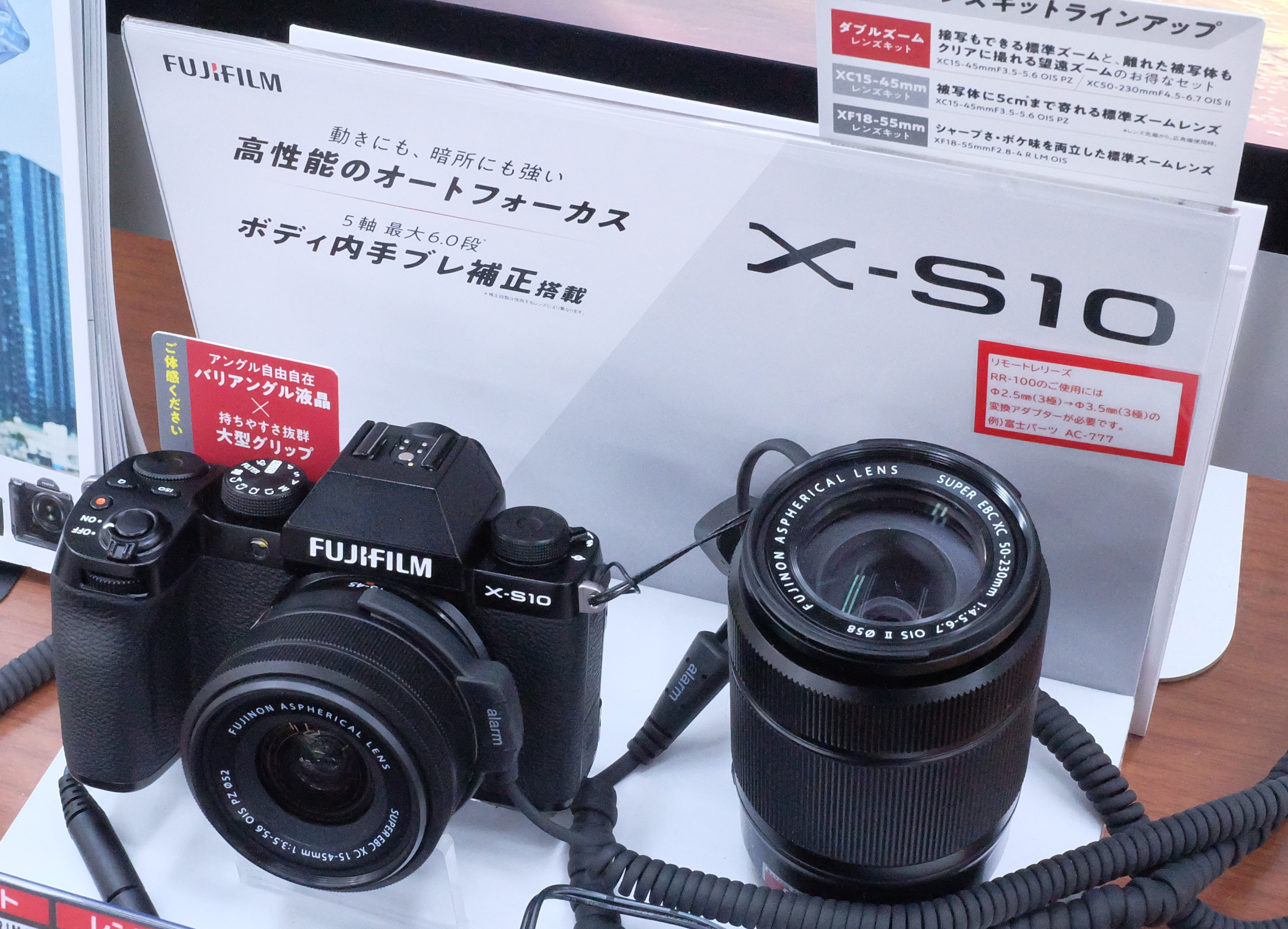

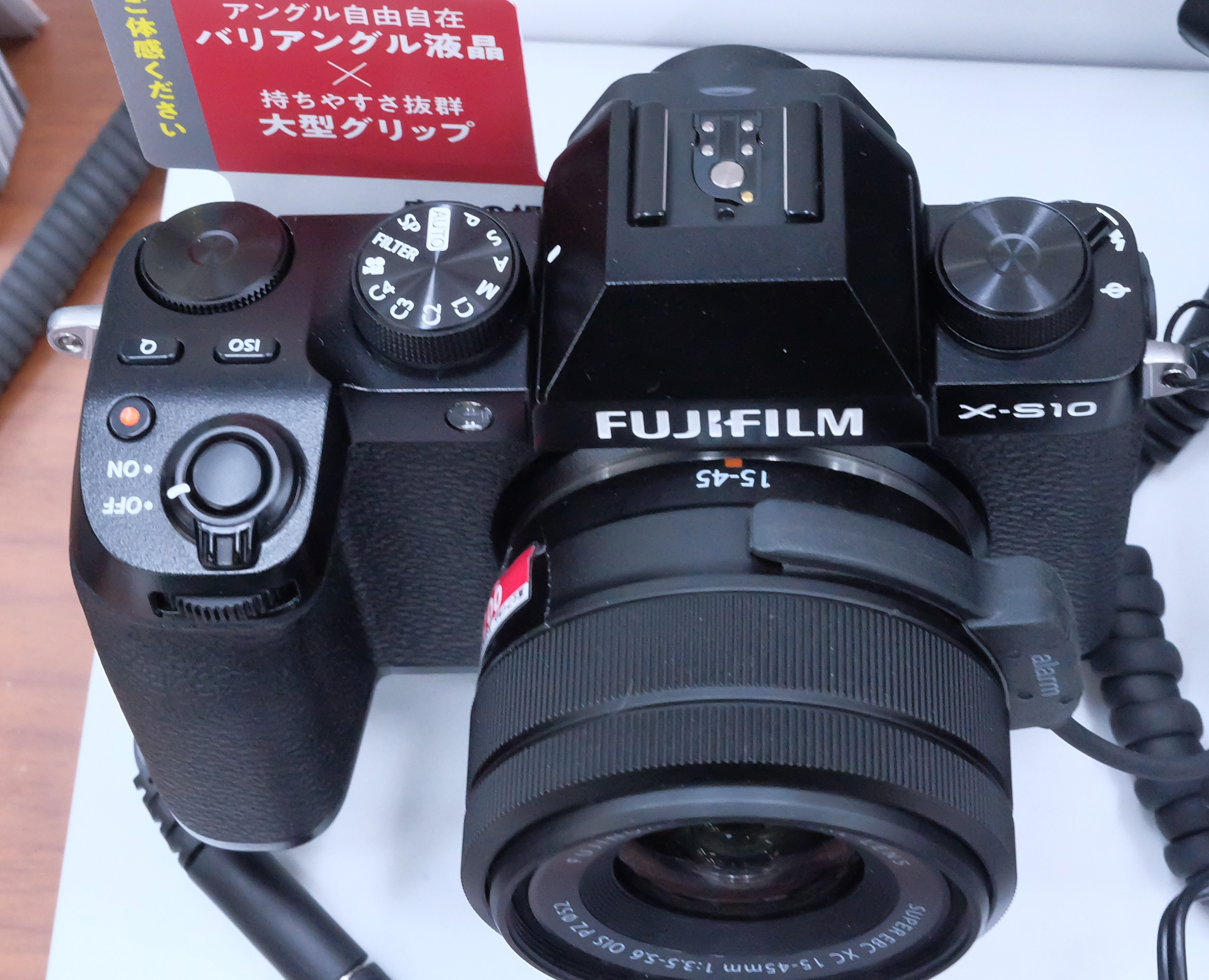

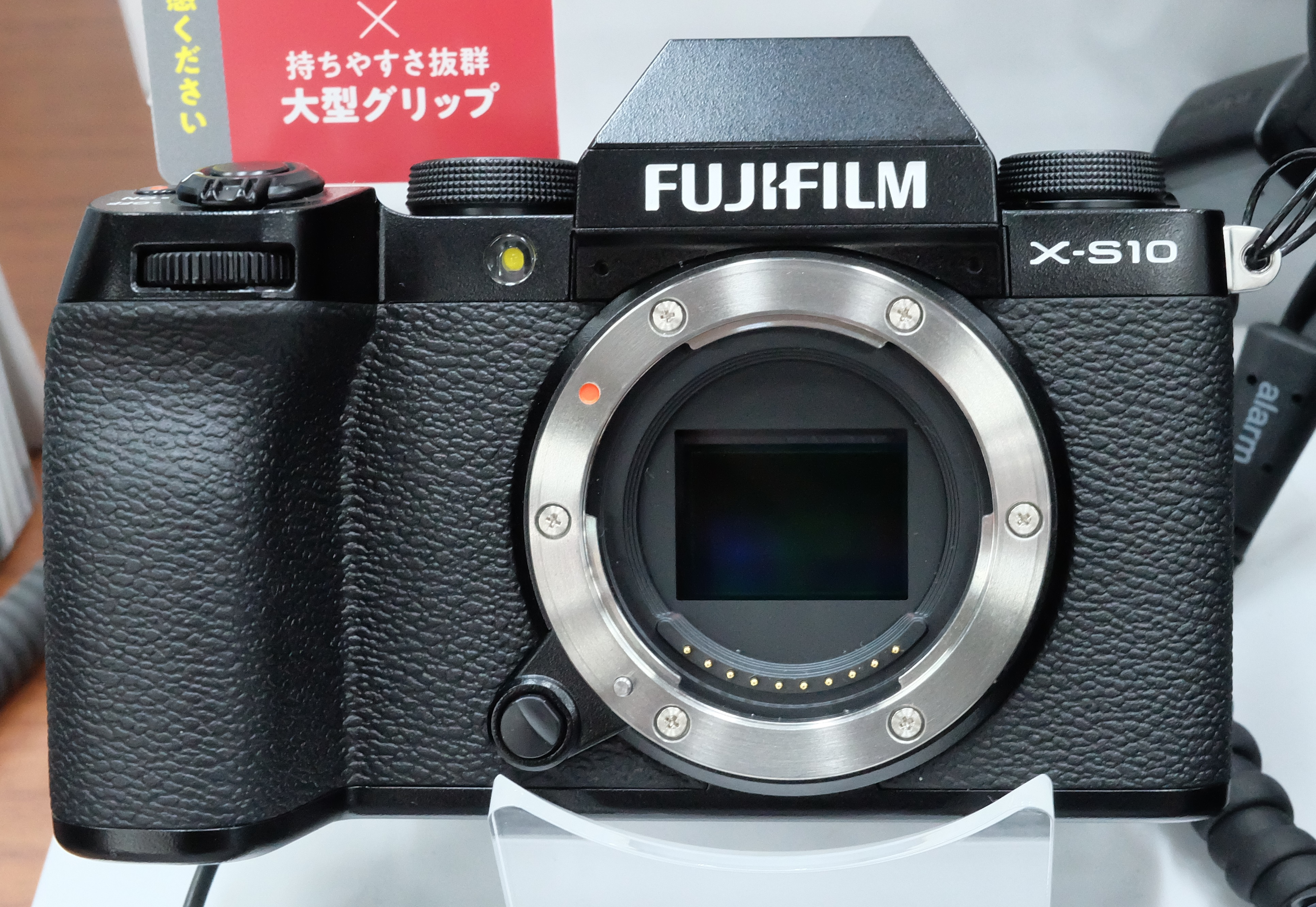

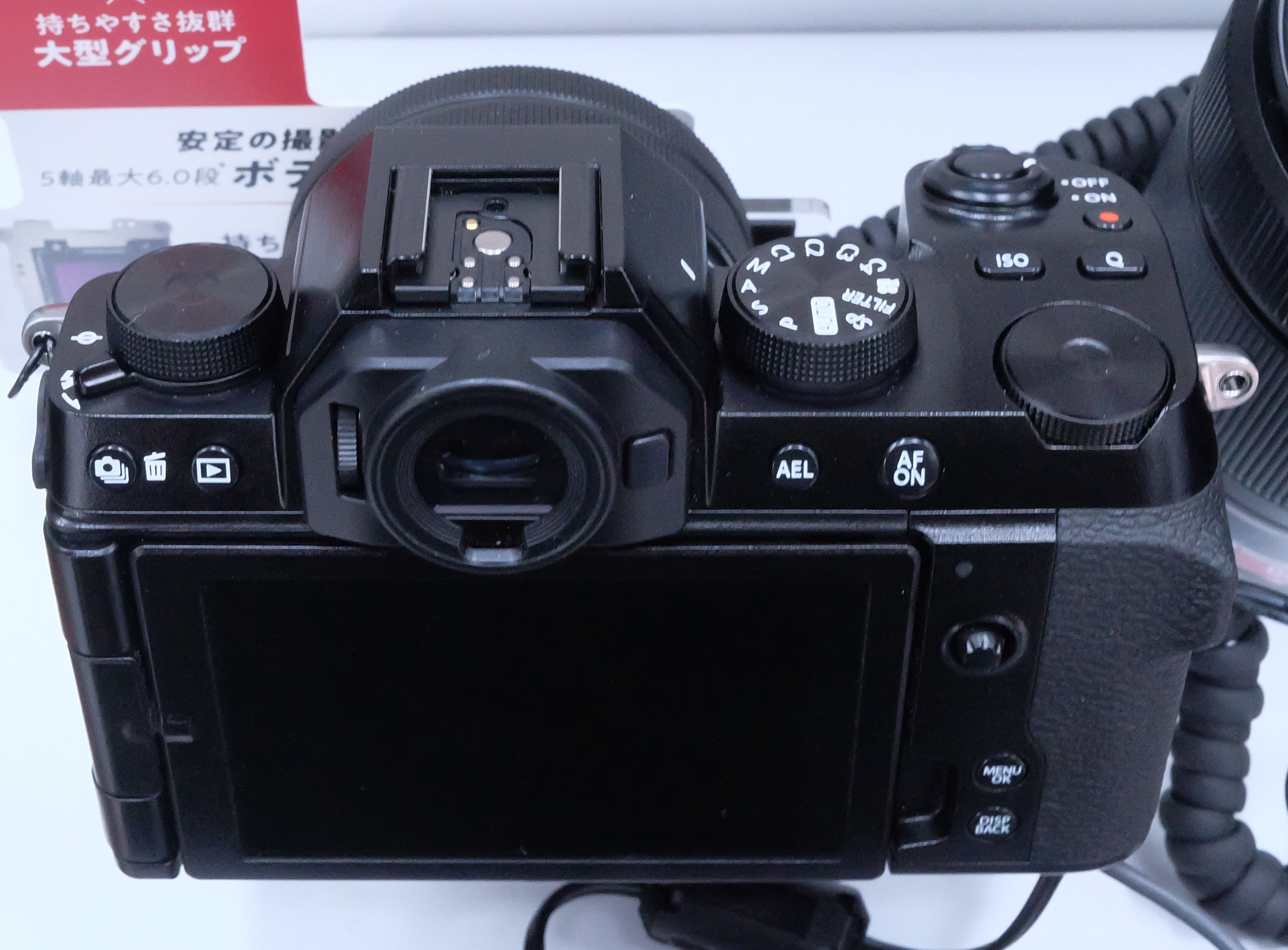

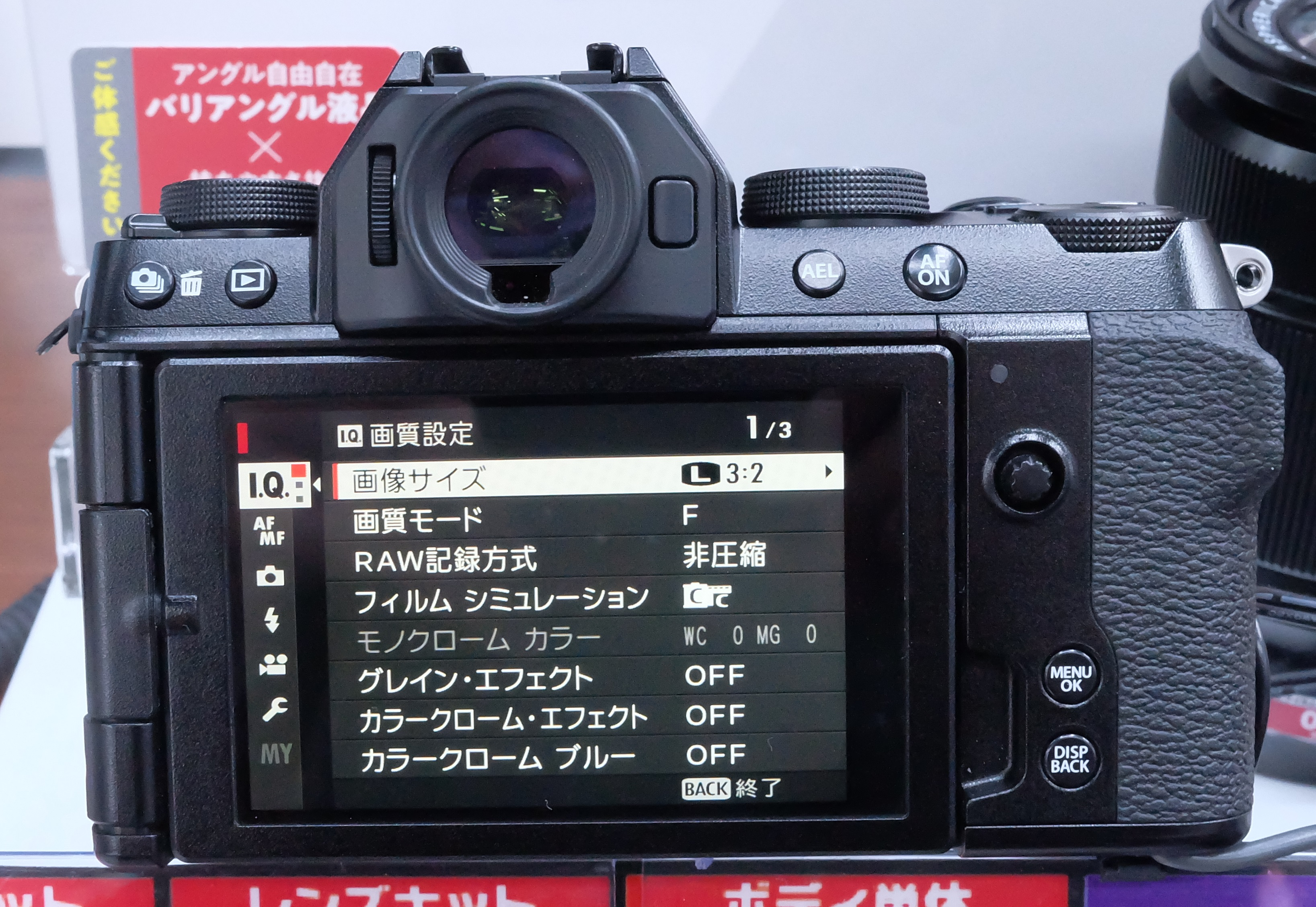

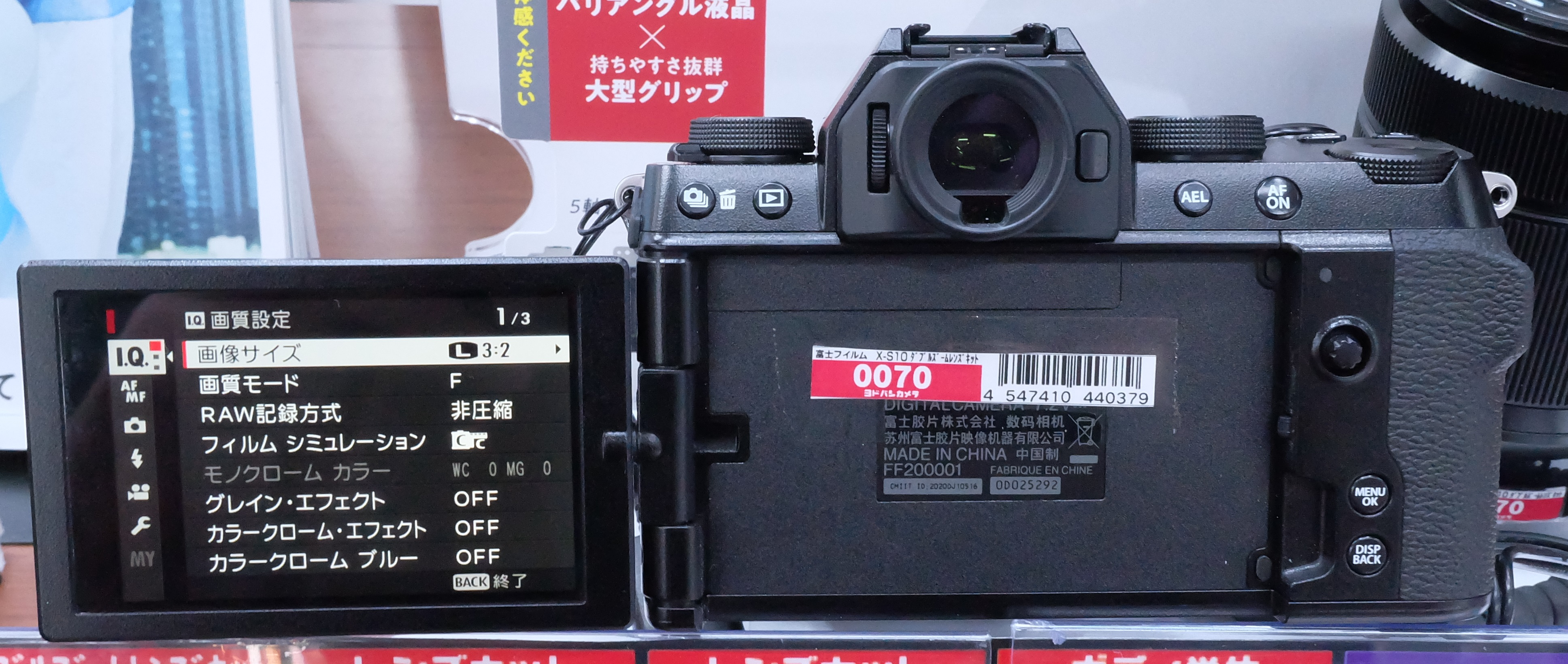

== Included accessories ==
- Li-ion battery NP-W126S
- USB cable
- Headphone Adapter
- Shoulder strap
- Body cap
- Owner's manual

Type	Lens	2011	2012	2013	2014	2015	2016	2017	2018	2019	2020	2021	2022	2023	2024	2025
MILC	G-mount; Medium format sensor							GFX 50S ^{F} ^{T}					GFX 50S II ^{F} ^{T}			
MILC	G-mount; Medium format sensor									GFX 50R ^{F} ^{T}						
MILC	G-mount; Medium format sensor										GFX 100 ^{F} ^{T}					GFX 100 II ^{F} ^{T}
MILC	G-mount; Medium format sensor											GFX 100 IR ^{F} ^{T}				
MILC	G-mount; Medium format sensor											GFX 100S ^{F} ^{T}				GFX 100S II^{F} ^{T}
MILC	G-mount; Medium format sensor															GFX Eterna 55^{F} ^{T}
MILC	Prime lens Medium format sensor															GFX 100RF ^{F} ^{T}
MILC	X-mount; APS-C sensor		X-Pro1				X-Pro2				X-Pro3 ^{f} ^{T}					
MILC	X-mount; APS-C sensor								X-H1 ^{F} ^{T}					X-H2 ^{A} ^{T}		
MILC	X-mount; APS-C sensor													X-H2S ^{A} ^{T}		
MILC	X-mount; APS-C sensor											X-S10 ^{A} ^{T}			X-S20 ^{A} ^{T}	
MILC	X-mount; APS-C sensor				X-T1 ^{f}			X-T2 ^{F}		X-T3 ^{F} ^{T}		X-T4 ^{A} ^{T}		X-T5 ^{F} ^{T}		
MILC	X-mount; APS-C sensor						X-T10 ^{f}	X-T20 ^{f} ^{T}		X-T30 ^{f} ^{T}			X-T30 II ^{f} ^{T}			X-T50 ^{f} ^{T}
MILC	X-mount; APS-C sensor									_{15} X-T100 ^{F} ^{T}	X-T200 ^{A} ^{T}					X-T30 III ^{f} ^{T}
MILC	X-mount; APS-C sensor			X-E1	X-E2		X-E2s		X-E3 ^{T}			X-E4 ^{f} ^{T}				X-E5 ^{f} ^{T}
MILC	X-mount; APS-C sensor				X-M1 ^{f}											X-M5 ^{A} ^{T}
MILC	X-mount; APS-C sensor				X-A1 ^{f}	X-A2 ^{f}		X-A3 ^{f} ^{T}	_{15} X-A5 ^{f} ^{T}		X-A7 ^{A} ^{T}					
MILC	X-mount; APS-C sensor							X-A10 ^{f}	X-A20 ^{f} ^{T}							
Compact	Prime lens APS-C sensor	X100		X100S		X100T		X100F			X100V ^{f} ^{T}				X100VI ^{f} ^{T}	
Compact	Prime lens APS-C sensor						X70 ^{f} ^{T}			XF10 ^{T}						
Compact	Prime lens 1" sensor															X half ^{T}
Compact	Zoom lens^{2}/_{3}" sensor		X10	X20		X30 ^{f}										
Compact	Zoom lens^{2}/_{3}" sensor				XQ1	XQ2										
Compact	Zoom lens^{2}/_{3}" sensor			XF1												
Bridge	^{2}/_{3}" sensor		X-S1 ^{f}													
Type	Lens															
Type	Lens	2011	2012	2013	2014	2015	2016	2017	2018	2019	2020	2021	2022	2023	2024	2025
