= Fujifilm X-Trans sensor =

Type of photosensor

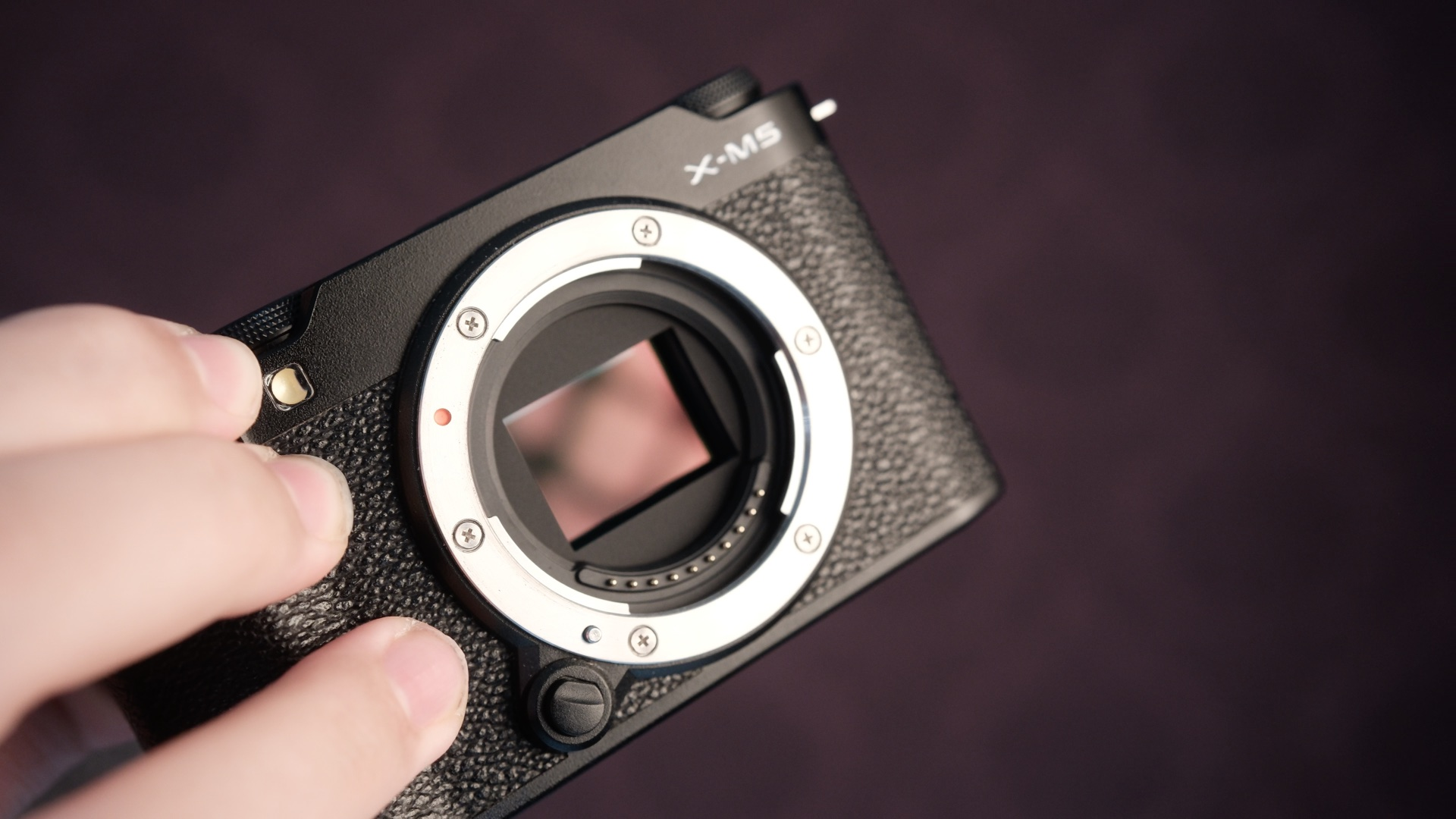
Fujifilm X-Trans IV Sensor on X-M5 camera

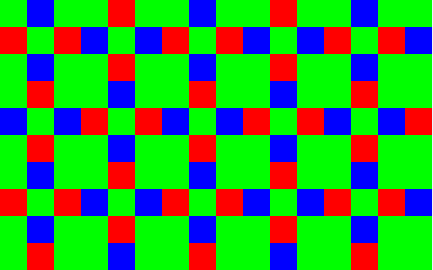
X-Trans filter array

Bayer filter array

The Fujifilm X-Trans is an image sensor with a colour filter array arrangement developed by Fujifilm and used in its Fujifilm X series cameras. Unlike most sensors featuring a conventional Bayer filter array, X-Trans sensors have a unique 6 by 6 pattern of photosites. Fujifilm claims that this layout can minimise moiré effects, and in turn increase resolution by eliminating the need for a low-pass filter.

== Details ==
Typical Bayer sensor arrays have RGB photosites in a repeated 2 by 2 pattern. When it overlaps with a regular pattern that is being captured, a new interference pattern can occur that does not exist in real life. In contrast, X-Trans sensors have a more irregular pattern of RGB photosites than conventional Bayer array sensors, reducing the likelihood of interference and removing a need for a low-pass filter that lowers image resolution.

Conventional Bayer sensors can also produce false colour as they do not have R and B photosites in some horizontal and vertical lines, Fujifilm claims that X-Trans sensors on the other hand have an improved colour reproduction due to all horizontal and vertical lines containing at least one R, G and B pixel out of every 6.

Fujifilm claims that APS-C sized X-Trans sensors, while being physically smaller, have a greater perceived resolution than the number of pixels on the sensor and are said to be on par with some full frame sensors.

While the first three generations of X-Trans sensors are front-illuminated, the fourth generation uses the principle of backside illumination. This improves noise levels and image quality.

== Drawbacks ==
=== Image artifacts ===
Under certain conditions, cameras equipped with X-Trans II and III sensors can exhibit purple flare/grid artifacts in backlit photos. This occurs due to the particular arrangement of the phase detection and masking layers on the sensor. The appearance of the effect can vary with the demosaicing algorithms in use.

== Future development ==
In an interview with DPreview during the CP+ 2017 show in Yokohama, Japan Fujifilm confirmed that an X-Trans sensor array is to be used for its next generation of APS-C sized sensors, whilst larger medium format sensors will continue using a conventional Bayer array because of the increased processing requirements of X-Trans filter arrangement.

== List of X-Trans sensors ==
Sensor Model	Number of effective pixels	Total number of pixels	Sensor type	Sensor size	First announcement date	Utilizing cameras
X-Trans	16.3 MP			23.6 mm x 15.6 mm (APS-C)	9 January 2012	Fujifilm X-Pro1 Fujifilm X-E1 Fujifilm X-M1
X-Trans II	16.3 MP	16.7 MP		23.6 mm x 15.6 mm (APS-C)	7 January 2013	Fujifilm X100S Fujifilm X-E2 Fujifilm X-T1 Fujifilm X100T Fujifilm X-T10 Fujifilm X-E2s Fujifilm X70
X-Trans II	12 MP	14.5 MP		2/3-inch	7 January 2013	Fujifilm X20 Fujifilm XQ1 Fujifilm X30 Fujifilm XQ2
X-Trans III	24.3 MP			23.6 mm x 15.6 mm (APS-C)	14 January 2016	Fujifilm X-Pro2 Fujifilm X-T2 Fujifilm X100F Fujifilm X-T20 Fujifilm X-E3 Fujifilm X-H1
X-Trans 4	26.1 MP		BSI	23.5 mm x 15.6 mm (APS-C)	20 September 2018	Fujifilm X-T3 Fujifilm X-T4 Fujifilm X-T30 Fujifilm X-T30 II Fujifilm X-T30 III Fujifilm X-Pro3 Fujifilm X100V Fujifilm X-S10 Fujifilm X-S20 Fujifilm X-E4 Fujifilm X-M5
X-Trans 5 HS	26.16 MP		BSI, Stacked	23.6 mm x 15.6 mm (APS-C)	31 May 2022	Fujifilm X-H2S
X-Trans 5 HR	40 MP		BSI	23.6 mm x 15.6 mm (APS-C)	8 September 2022	Fujifilm X-H2 Fujifilm X-T5 Fujifilm X100VI Fujifilm X-T50 Fujifilm X-E5
