= Fujifilm X100 =

Series of digital compact cameras

Fujifilm X100 series
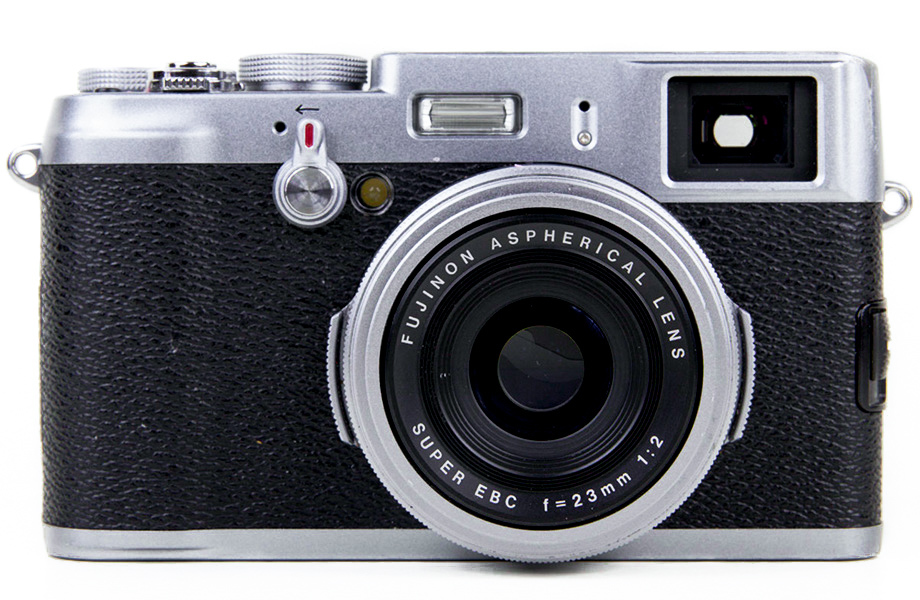
- Fujifilm FinePix X100

Overview
- Maker: Fujifilm
- Type: Large sensor fixed-lens camera
- Released: X100: September 2010; 16 years ago X100S: January 2013; 13 years ago X100T: 10 September 2014; 12 years ago X100F: 19 January 2017; 9 years ago X100V: 4 February 2020; 6 years ago X100VI: 28 February 2024; 2 years ago
- Intro price: X100: USD 1,199; X100S: USD 1,299; X100T: USD 1,299; X100F: USD 1,299; X100V: USD 1,399; X100VI: USD 1,599

Lens
- Lens mount: Fixed lens
- Lens: 23 mm (35 mm equivalent)
- F-numbers: f/2

Sensor/medium
- Sensor: CMOS
- Sensor type: X100: EXR CMOS; X100S: X-Trans CMOS II; X100T: X-Trans CMOS II; X100F: X-Trans CMOS III; X100V: X-Trans CMOS 4 X100VI: X-Trans CMOS 5
- Sensor size: APS-C; X100: 23.5 mm × 15.7 mm X100S: 23.6 mm × 15.8 mm X100T: 23.6 mm x 15.8 mm X100F: 23.6 mm x 15.6 mm X100V: 23.5 mm × 15.6 mm X100VI: 23.5 mm × 15.7 mm
- Sensor maker: Sony
- Maximum resolution: X100: 12 megapixels X100S: 16 megapixels X100T: 16 megapixels X100F: 24 megapixels X100V: 26 megapixels X100VI: 40 megapixels
- Film speed: X100: ISO 200 - 6400; X100S: ISO 200 - 6400; X100T: ISO 200 - 6400; X100F: ISO 200 - 12800; X100V: ISO 160 - 12800; X100VI: ISO 125 - 12800
- Storage media: SD, SDHC, SDXC, (UHS-I)

Focusing
- Focus modes: Single point, Zone, Wide/Tracking
- Focus areas: X100: 49 focus point X100S: 49 focus point X100T: 49 focus point X100F: 91 focus point X100V: 117 focus point X100VI: 117 focus point
- Focus bracketing: AUTO, MANUAL

Exposure/metering
- Exposure: TTL 256-zone metering
- Exposure modes: Program AE, Aperture Priority AE, Shutter Speed Priority AE, Manual Exposure
- Exposure metering: Through-the-lens
- Metering modes: Multi, Spot, Average, Center Weighted

Flash
- Flash: Built in, Super Intelligent Flash
- Flash synchronization: 1st Curtain, 2nd Curtain

Shutter
- Shutter: Lens Shutter - Includes Electronic Shutter
- Shutter speeds: X100: 1/4000 s X100S: 1/4000 s X100T: 1/32000 s X100F: 1/32000 s X100V: 1/32000 s X100VI: 1/180000 s
- Continuous shooting: X100: 5 fps X100S: 6 fps X100T: 6 fps X100F: 8 fps X100V: 11 fps X100VI: 11 fps

Viewfinder
- Viewfinder: Hybrid; Optical and Electronic
- Viewfinder magnification: X100: 0.50; X100S: 0.43; X100T: 0.43; X100F: 0.43; X100V: 0.52; X100VI: 0.52

Image processing
- Image processor: X100: EXR Processor; X100S: EXR Processor II; X100T: EXR Processor II; X100F: X-Processor Pro; X100V: X-Processor 4 X100VI: X-Processor 5
- White balance: Automatic Scene recognition, Custom, Color temperature selection, Daylight, Shade, Fluorescent, Incandescent, Underwater
- WB bracketing: ±1, ±2, ±3
- Dynamic range bracketing: AUTO, 100%, 200%, 400%

General
- Video recording: X100: up to 720p at 30 fps X100S: up to 1080p at 60 fps X100T: up to 1080p at 60 fps X100F: up to 1080p at 60 fps X100V: up to 4K at 30 fps X100VI: up to 4K at 30 fps
- LCD screen: Fixed-type LCD monitor X100: 2.8" 460K dots X100S: 2.8" 460K dots X100T: 3" 1.04M dots X100F: 3" 1.04M dots X100V: 3" 1.62M dots touchscreen X100VI: 3" 1.62M dots touchscreen
- Battery: X100: NP-95 type X100S: NP-95 type X100T: NP-95 type X100F: NP-W126S; X100V: NP-W126S; X100VI: NP-W126S
- AV port(s): X100: mini-HDMI; X100S: micro-HDMI; X100T: micro-HDMI; X100F: micro-HDMI, Φ2.5mm; X100V: micro-HDMI, Φ2.5mm; X100VI: micro-HDMI, Φ2.5mm
- Data port(s): X100: UC-E6 USB 2.0; X100S: UC-E6 USB 2.0; X100T: USB Micro-B 2.0, WiFi; X100F: USB Micro-B 2.0, WiFi; X100V: USB-C 3.1, WiFi, Bluetooth; X100VI: USB-C 10 Gbps, WiFi, Bluetooth 4.2
- Body features: X100: Magnesium and Aluminum body X100S: Magnesium and Aluminum body X100T: Die-cast magnesium body X100F: Magnesium alloy body X100V: Weathersealed body, Aluminum with satin coating
- Dimensions: X100: 126.5 mm × 74.4 mm × 53.9 mm (4.98 in × 2.93 in × 2.12 in); X100S: 126.5 mm × 74.4 mm × 53.9 mm (4.98 in × 2.93 in × 2.12 in); X100T: 127 mm × 74 mm × 52 mm (5.0 in × 2.9 in × 2.0 in); X100F: 127 mm × 75 mm × 52 mm (5.0 in × 3.0 in × 2.0 in); X100V: 128 mm × 75 mm × 53 mm (5.0 in × 3.0 in × 2.1 in); X100VI: 128 mm × 75 mm × 55 mm (5.0 in × 3.0 in × 2.2 in)
- Weight: X100: 445 g (0.981 lb); X100S: 445 g (0.981 lb); X100T: 440 g (0.97 lb); X100F: 469 g (1.034 lb); X100V: 478 g (1.054 lb); X100VI: 521 g (1.149 lb) including battery and memory card
- Made in: X100, X100S, X100T, X100F, X100V: Japan; X100VI: China or Japan

The Fujifilm X100 is a series of digital compact cameras with a fixed prime lens. Originally part of the FinePix line, then becoming a member of the X series from Fujifilm, the X100 series includes the FinePix X100, X100S, X100T, X100F, X100V, and X100VI. They each have a large image sensor and a 23 mm lens (35 mm equivalent angle of view in full frame format). All six cameras have received generally positive reviews.

The Fujifilm FinePix X100 was initially shown at the Photokina show in September 2010 and was subsequently introduced in February 2011. It was the first model in the Fujifilm X-series of cameras and has since been joined by numerous models. It is superseded by the Fujifilm X100S.

== Fujifilm FinePix X100 ==
The FinePix X100, the original model in the line, was introduced in 2011. This was the first camera in what would grow to become the Fujifilm X series although that designation came later. The X100's hybrid viewer emulates famous traditional (optical) range-finder cameras. The X100 series has evolved from the X100 model (12.3 Mp) in 2011 to the X100 S (second, 16.3 Mp) in 2013, X100 T (third)in 2014, X100 F (fourth, 24.3 Mp) in 2017, X100 V (five in Roman numbers as the "F" was already taken y "Fourth", 26.1 Mp) in 2020, X100 VI (6th model in the series, 40 Mp and "in-body image stabilization" (IBIS)) in 2024, ...

=== Key features ===
- 12.3 MP, APS-C sized CMOS sensor
- Hybrid optical/electric viewfinder
- 23 mm (35 mm equivalent (Note: Equivalent angle of view in full frame format)) fixed prime lens
- Classic styling

=== Innovation ===
The FinePix X100 was the first camera to show a number of new technologies developed by Fujifilm. These include a hybrid viewfinder which allows the user to choose between the emulation of a conventional optical viewfinder with an electronic overlay, or an electronic viewfinder.

=== Reception ===
The X100 received numerous favourable reviews and a number of awards. These include Innovative Camera of the Year from Ephotozine and Best Premium Camera in the 2011 TIPA awards. In most cases, the prizes were awarded for the combination of technology and picture quality, but the X100 has also received plaudits for its design outside the photography market, coming top of Stuff magazine's Cool List for 2011 and in October 2012 receiving Good Design Award from Good Design Award (Japan). Digital Photography Review gave it a score of 75% and a silver award, noting that it "combines excellent image quality, solid build and a superb viewfinder with somewhat sluggish and quirky operation", adding that "It's been much improved by multiple firmware updates since its initial incarnation, and despite its flaws, is now a very likeable camera indeed.".

=== Issues ===
The first iterations of the X100 series have suffered of slow auto-focus. A problem that has been gradually addressed, especially with the latest model, the X100 VI (6). Some X100 cameras have reportedly suffered from 'sticky aperture disease' where the aperture blades lock up, leading to overexposure. Fujifilm has acknowledged this issue and will fix it under warranty.

On initial release the X100 was widely reported to have various issues. Many, but not all, of these issues were fixed through a series of firmware updates made available by Fujifilm.

== Fujifilm X100S ==
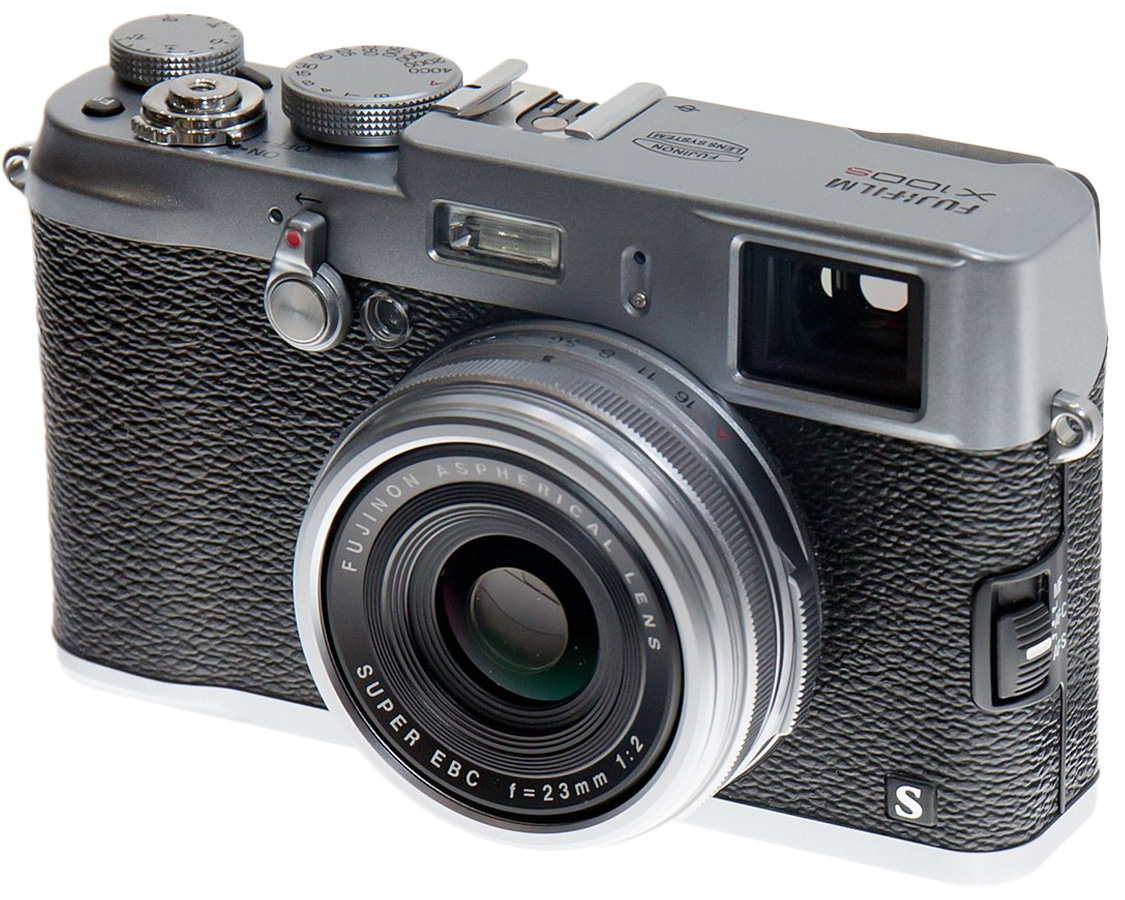
Fujifilm X100S

The Fujifilm X100S (Second) is the successor to the Fujifilm FinePix X100. Announced in January 2013, it is a model similar to the X100 yet addressing some of the issues that the X100 had, and resembles it superficially, but with internal changes. It has been compared with the Leica M series.

It was replaced in September 2014 with the Fujifilm X100T.

=== Differences from the X100 ===
- 16.3 MP Fujifilm X-Trans CMOS II sensor instead of 12.3 MP CMOS sensor with primary colour filter (Bayer filter)
- Redesign of menus
- Quick Menu (Q) button
- Uses X-Trans color filter pattern (taken from the X-E1 and X-Pro1), instead of Bayer pattern
- No optical low pass filter (OLPF), to give sharper images
- Phase detection within the X-Trans CMOS II sensor increasing autofocus speed to 0.08 s in good light
- The faster the focus ring is rotated, the quicker the focus is adjusted
- Focus mode switch options have been reorganised such that the most commonly used functions (Autofocus Single and Manual Focus) surround the least used function (Autofocus Continuous) for more efficient operation
- Hybrid viewfinder switch has been altered in shape to allow for easier one-handed operation
- Autofocus point selection has been altered to allow one button default access

=== Reception ===
The X100S received generally positive reviews:

- Digital Photography Review gave it a score of 81% and a gold award, describing it as a "hugely likable, very capable camera with some useful tricks up its sleeve".
- Photography Life gave it 4.6 stars out of 5, describing it as "an amazing camera".

== Fujifilm X100T ==
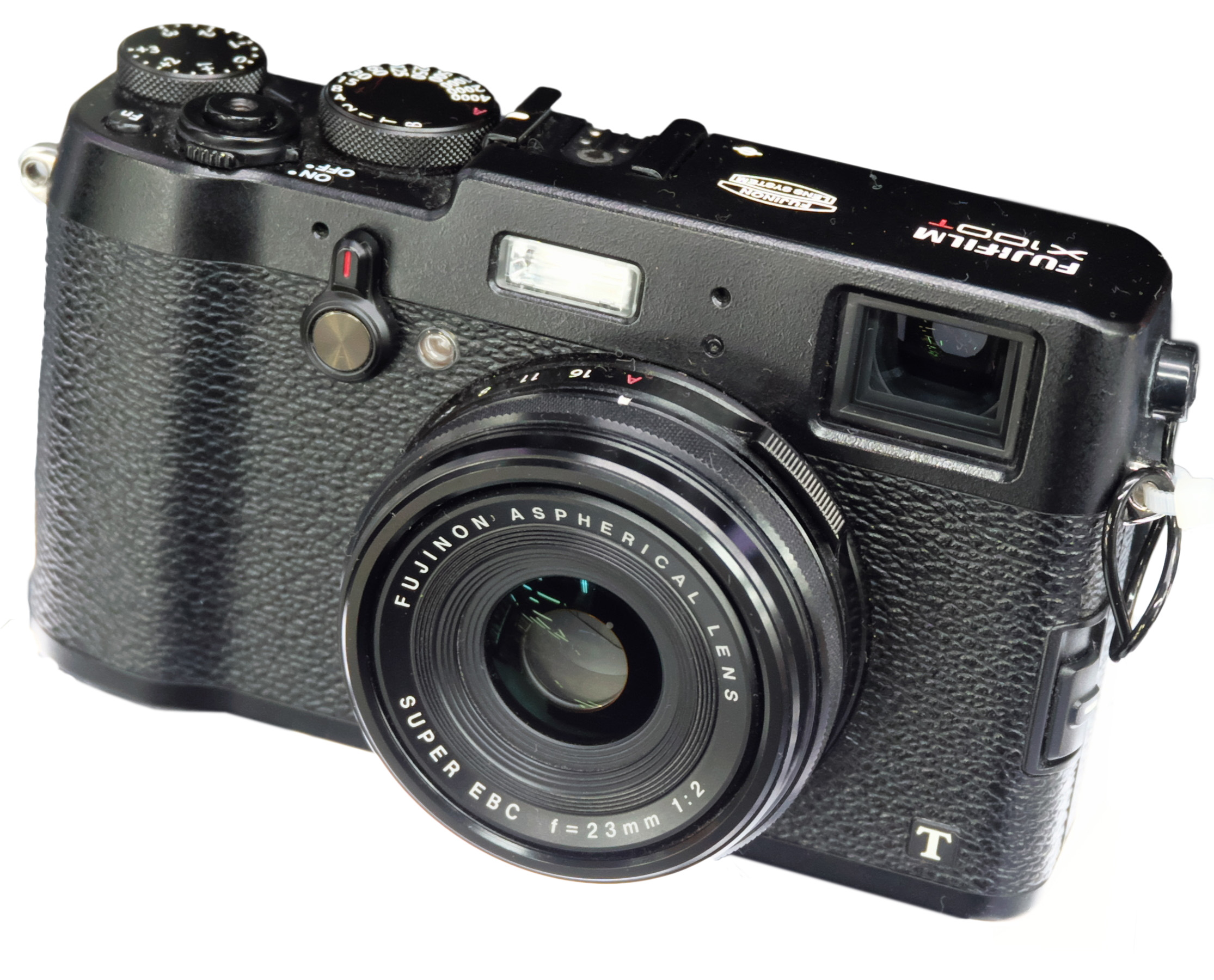
Fujifilm X100T

The Fujifilm X100T (Third) was announced by Fujifilm on September 10, 2014. It is the successor to the X100S. It is visually very similar to the X100S, and shares many of its core specifications (including its lens and sensor), but features numerous iterative refinements and enhancements. It has the same 16.3 MP Fujifilm X-Trans CMOS II sensor as the X100S.

It was replaced in January 2017 with the Fujifilm X100F.

=== Differences from the X100S ===
- Advanced hybrid viewfinder, with electronic rangefinder
- Real-time parallax correction in optical viewfinder
- ±3EV exposure compensation
- optional electronic shutter (allowing silent operation and a shutter speed of 1/32000 of a second)
- 3.0-inch, 1040K-dot LCD screen
- "Classic Chrome" film simulation mode
- Built-in Wi-Fi
- Face recognition (when enabled, focuses automatically on the faces in the frame)

=== Reception ===
The X100T has received generally positive reviews:

- Digital Photography Review gave it a score of 81%, criticising its autofocus and video capabilities but noting "there's currently nothing to touch it in terms of the size/price/image quality balance it offers and the style with which it does so".
- Pocket-Lint.com gave it 4 stars out of 5, describing it as "a special little camera"

== Fujifilm X100F ==
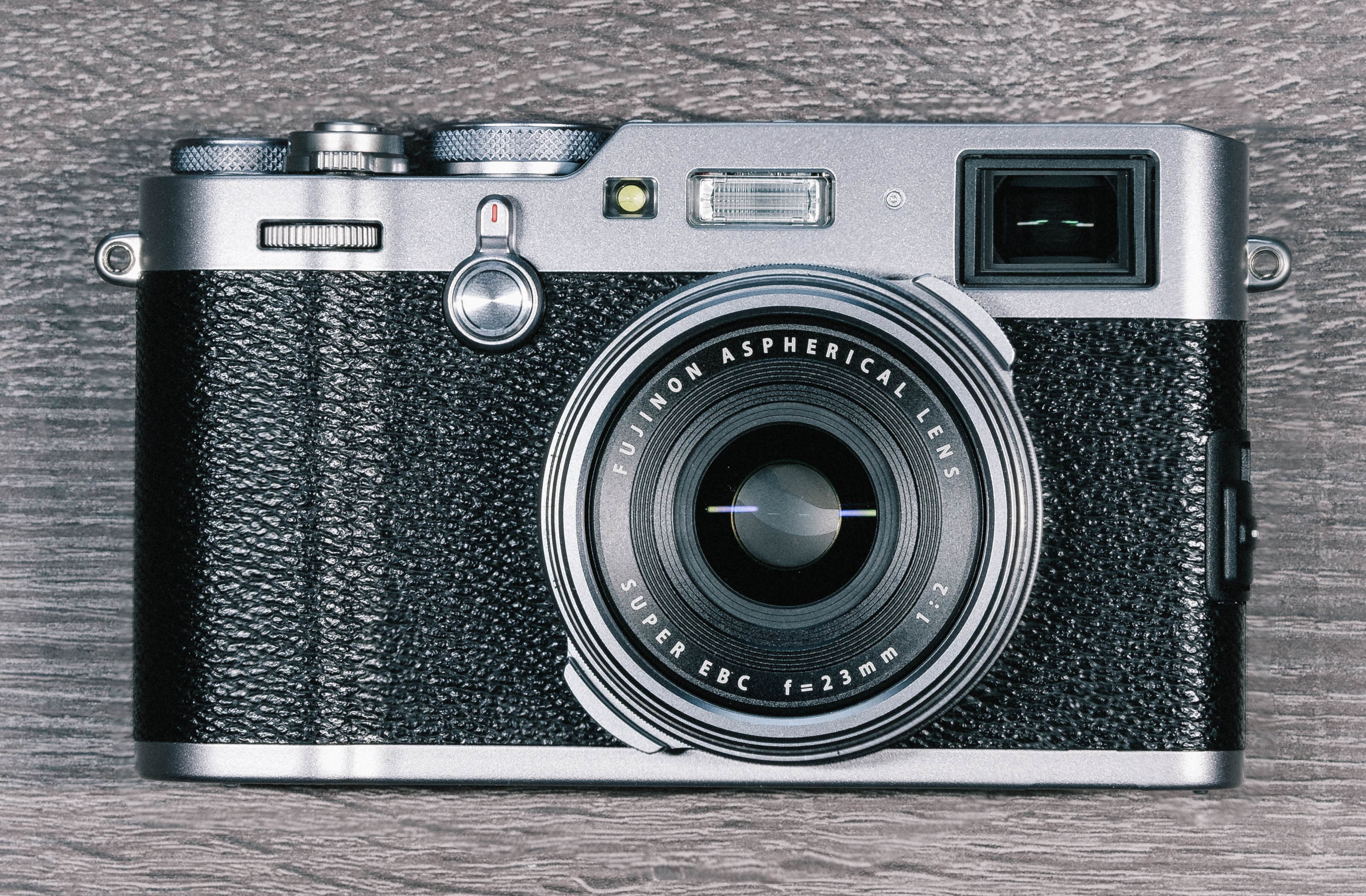
Fujifilm X100F

The Fujifilm X100F (Fourth), announced on January 19, 2017 is the successor to the Fujifilm X100T. The launch involved a number of videos from X-Photographers addressing the new features, see launch video. It features a number of improvements and refinements over the previous model, many of which were first introduced with the Fujifilm X-Pro2. The X100F was released on February 23, 2017.

=== Differences from the X100T ===
The following are the major differences from the X100T:

- A third-generation 24.3 MP X-Trans CMOS III sensor
- X-Processor Pro image processor
- A new button layout with a joystick autofocus control (similar to X-Pro2 and X-T2), making it easier to select AF points
- Built-In ISO dial
- Added command dial on the front of the camera
- C mode on exposure compensation dial, allowing up to 5 stops exposure compensation
- A larger battery, model NP-W126S (same as X-T2)
- An improved 91-point autofocus system
- Improved sensitivity (ISO 200–12800, expandable to ISO 100–51200)
- Viewfinder has 6x magnification
- Acros film simulation
- 60 fps EVF refresh rate
- Additional continuous shooting mode speeds (3, 4, 5, and 8 fps) along with larger buffer
- New LED AF lamp
- Digital teleconverter simulating 50 mm and 70 mm perspectives (JPG only)

=== Reception ===
The X100F was very well received, mostly for its improved sensor and autofocus capability. Digital Photography Review gave it a score of 83% and a gold award, calling it "a true photographers' camera". At the 2017 Technical Image Press Association Awards, the X100F won the award for best professional compact camera.

== Fujifilm X100V ==
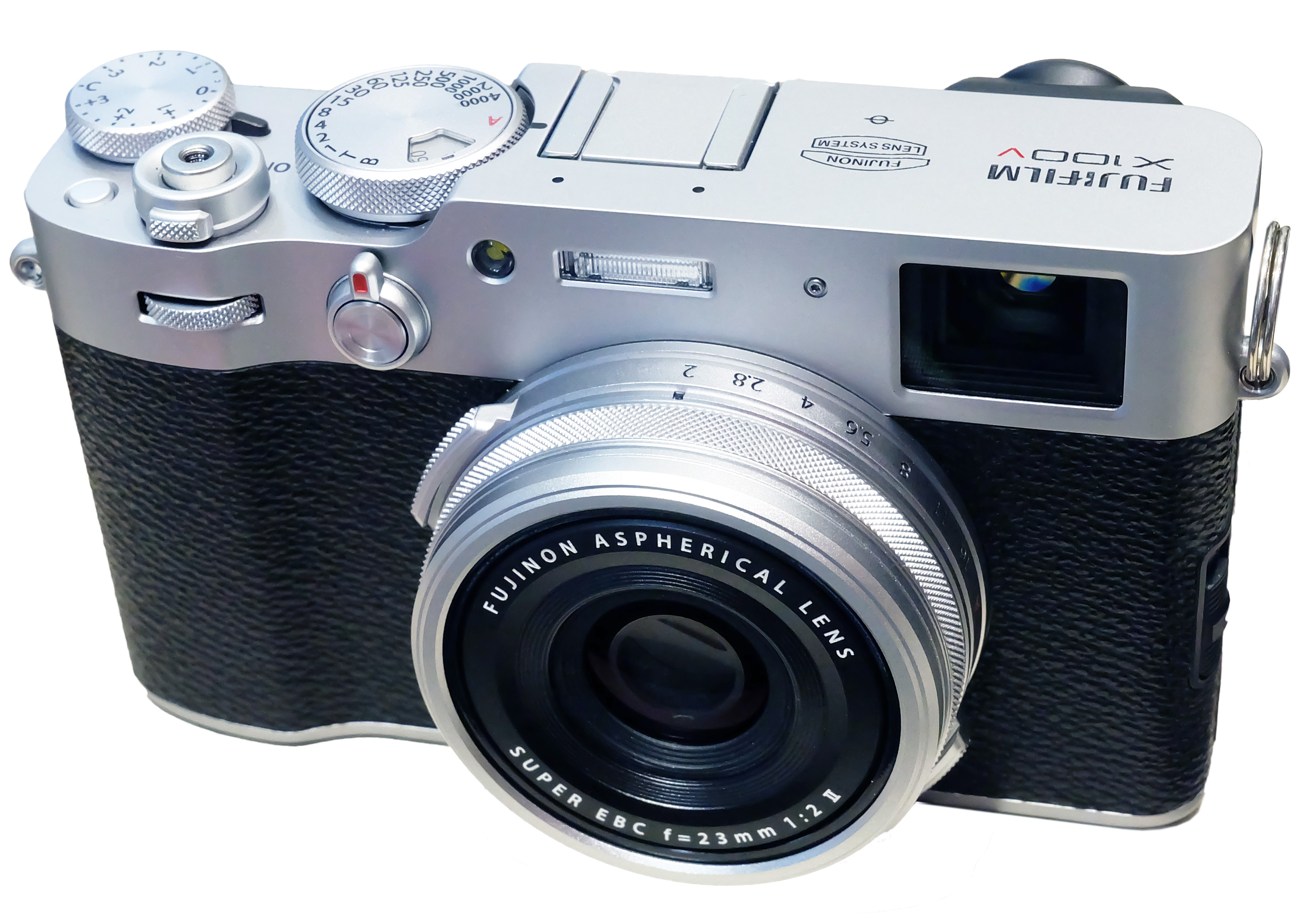
Fujifilm X100V

The Fujifilm X100V (Roman Numeral "Fifth"), announced on February 4, 2020, is the successor to the Fujifilm X100F. It features a redesigned lens, a fourth generation X-Trans sensor, a 2-way tilting rear LCD screen, and partial weather resistance. (Note: An additional protection filter or conversion lens is required to extend weather resistance to the lens.) The camera also includes additional film simulation modes and other software improvements. The X100V is $100 more expensive than its predecessor, the X100F. With its redesigned lens system, it was found to exhibit less distortion than the previous X100 cameras and has an improved close focus performance.

=== Differences from the X100F ===
The following are the major differences from the X100F:

- 4th generation 26.1 MP X-Trans CMOS sensor
- Sharper 23 mm ƒ/2.0 lens
- 4K Video recording
- 2-way tilting rear LCD screen
- Touchscreen
- Weather resistance (when used with a lens filter)
- Larger, higher resolution OLED viewfinder
- Increased focus points to 425
- Bluetooth
- Faster continuous shooting at 11 fps
- Rear 4-way controller is replaced by a mini joystick and touchscreen functions
- Four rear black buttons are flush to the surface
- USB-C 3.1 port

=== Reception ===
The X100V is a well received camera, being praised for its updated sensor that offers good noise performance and fast readout as well as its highly tunable JPEG engine that reduces noise very well producing good detail. It was also praised for its 4K recording feature, a first for the series. Digital Photography Review gave it a score of 86% and a gold award, calling it "the most capable prime-lens compact camera, ever". The current price of the Fuji X100V has sky rocketed in value on some sites being $1879 when it was originally released at $1000.

== Fujifilm X100VI ==
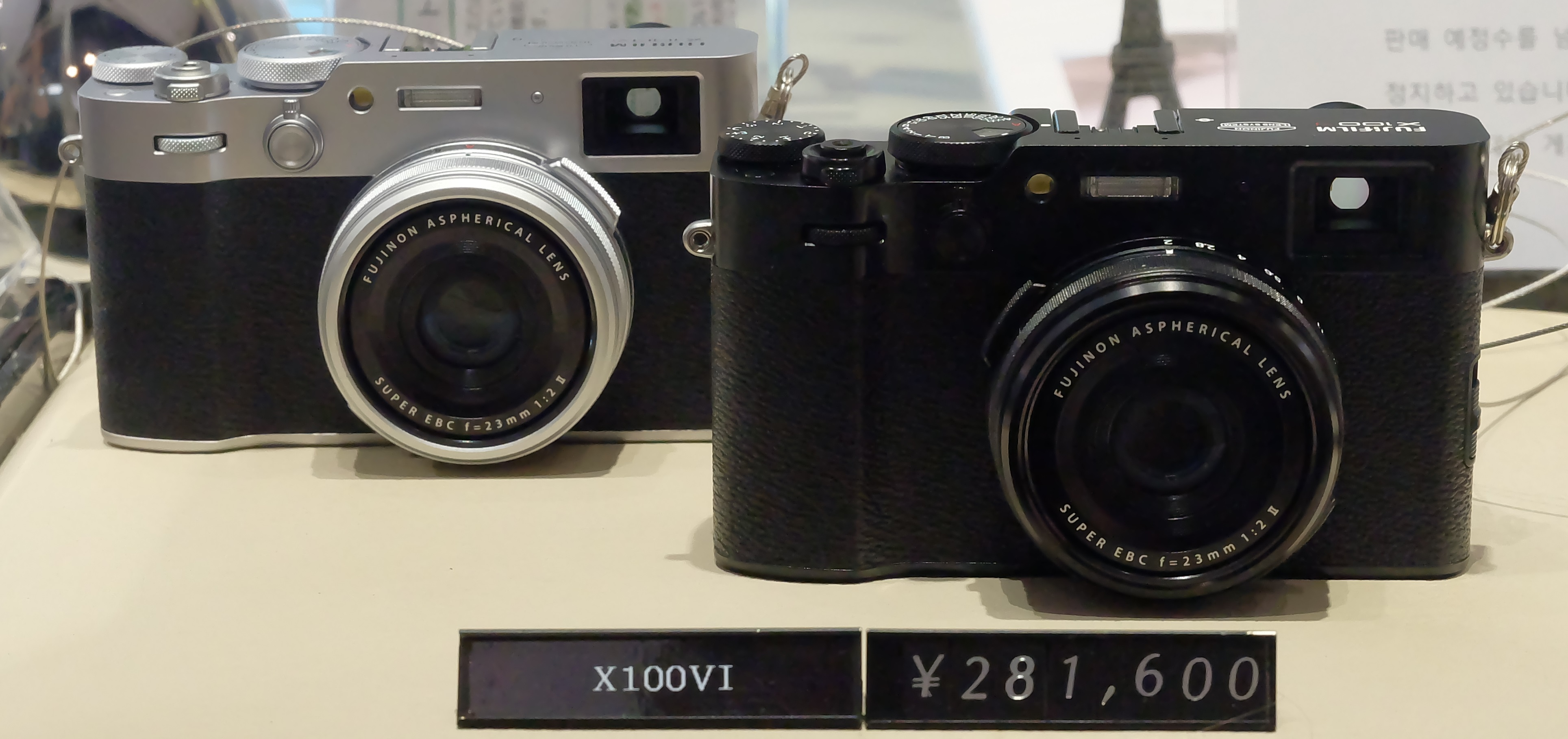
Fujifilm X100VI

The Fujifilm X100VI (Roman Numeral "Sixth") was announced on 20 February 2024 at an MSRP of US$1,599.95. It was first available to purchase in late March. A limited-edition model was made with an MSRP of US$1,999.99 and a limited number produced at 1,934 units.

Fujifilm moved production of the camera to China in order to produce more units. In June 2025, in response to uncertainty over high United States tariffs on Chinese-made goods, Fujifilm began producing the X100VI in Japan for the US market.

=== Differences from the X100V ===
The following are the major differences from the X100V:

- 5th generation 40.2 MP X-Trans CMOS sensor
- X Processor 5
- Added In-Body Image Stabilization (IBIS) - 6-stop
- Improved ISO range, starting at ISO 125
- 6K Video recording
- Increased Maximum Electronic Shutter at 1/180,000 sec
- Increased Film Simulations, including the Reala Ace
- Made in China or Japan

=== Reception ===
Upon release the X100VI was well-received by critics and consumers. It quickly became one of the most successful product launches for Fujifilm. As of late-2024, demand for the camera outpaces production. Digital Photography Review gave it a score of 87% and praised its improvements over its predecessor.

== X100 chronology ==
2011				2012				2013				2014				2015				2016				2017				2018				2019				2020				2021				2022				2023				2024				2025				2026			
1	2	3	4	1	2	3	4	1	2	3	4	1	2	3	4	1	2	3	4	1	2	3	4	1	2	3	4	1	2	3	4	1	2	3	4	1	2	3	4	1	2	3	4	1	2	3	4	1	2	3	4	1	2	3	4	1	2	3	4	1	2	3	4
FinePix X100								X100S							X100T									X100F													X100V															X100VI											

Image processor: EXR | X-Trans II | X-Trans III | X-Trans IV | X-Trans V

== Accessories ==
Due to their similarities, the different X100 cameras accept many of the same accessories.

=== Conversion lenses ===
- Wide Conversion Lens WCL-X100 II – gives a magnification factor to the 23 mm fixed lens of 0.8×, providing a focal length of 19 mm (28 mm equivalent)
- Tele Conversion Lens TCL-X100 II – multiplies the 23 mm fixed lens by approximately 1.4×, providing an equivalent focal length of 33 mm (50 mm equivalent angle of view)
- Tele Conversion Lens TCL-X100 – as above but with manual mode switching in the camera menus.

=== Flashguns ===
- Fujifilm EF-20
- Fujifilm EF-X20
- Fujifilm EF-42

== See also ==
- Fujifilm X series
- Fujifilm cameras
- List of large sensor fixed-lens cameras
- List of retro-style digital cameras

== Notes ==
Type	Lens	2011	2012	2013	2014	2015	2016	2017	2018	2019	2020	2021	2022	2023	2024	2025	2026
MILC	G-mount; Medium format sensor							GFX 50S ^{F} ^{T}					GFX 50S II ^{F} ^{T}				
MILC	G-mount; Medium format sensor									GFX 50R ^{F} ^{T}							
MILC	G-mount; Medium format sensor										GFX 100 ^{F} ^{T}					GFX 100 II ^{F} ^{T}	
MILC	G-mount; Medium format sensor											GFX 100 IR ^{F} ^{T}					
MILC	G-mount; Medium format sensor											GFX 100S ^{F} ^{T}				GFX 100S II ^{F} ^{T}	
MILC	G-mount; Medium format sensor															GFX Eterna 55 ^{F} ^{T}	
MILC	Prime lens Medium format sensor															GFX 100RF ^{F} ^{T}	
MILC	X-mount; APS-C sensor		X-Pro1				X-Pro2				X-Pro3 ^{f} ^{T}						
MILC	X-mount; APS-C sensor								X-H1 ^{F} ^{T}					X-H2 ^{A} ^{T}			
MILC	X-mount; APS-C sensor													X-H2S ^{A} ^{T}			
MILC	X-mount; APS-C sensor											X-S10 ^{A} ^{T}			X-S20 ^{A} ^{T}		
MILC	X-mount; APS-C sensor				X-T1 ^{f}			X-T2 ^{F}		X-T3 ^{F} ^{T}		X-T4 ^{A} ^{T}		X-T5 ^{F} ^{T}			
MILC	X-mount; APS-C sensor															X-T50 ^{f} ^{T}	
MILC	X-mount; APS-C sensor						X-T10 ^{f}	X-T20 ^{f} ^{T}		X-T30 ^{f} ^{T}			X-T30 II ^{f} ^{T}			X-T30 III ^{f} ^{T}	
MILC	X-mount; APS-C sensor									_{15} X-T100 ^{F} ^{T}	X-T200 ^{A} ^{T}						
MILC	X-mount; APS-C sensor			X-E1	X-E2		X-E2s		X-E3 ^{T}			X-E4 ^{f} ^{T}				X-E5 ^{f} ^{T}	
MILC	X-mount; APS-C sensor				X-M1 ^{f}											X-M5 ^{A} ^{T}	
MILC	X-mount; APS-C sensor				X-A1 ^{f}	X-A2 ^{f}		X-A3 ^{f} ^{T}	_{15} X-A5 ^{f} ^{T}		X-A7 ^{A} ^{T}						
MILC	X-mount; APS-C sensor							X-A10 ^{f}	X-A20 ^{f} ^{T}								
Compact	Prime lens APS-C sensor	X100		X100S		X100T		X100F			X100V ^{f} ^{T}				X100VI ^{f} ^{T}		
Compact	Prime lens APS-C sensor						X70 ^{f} ^{T}			XF10 ^{T}							
Compact	Prime lens 1" sensor															X half ^{T}	
Compact	Zoom lens^{2}/_{3}" sensor		X10	X20		X30 ^{f}											
Compact	Zoom lens^{2}/_{3}" sensor				XQ1	XQ2											
Compact	Zoom lens^{2}/_{3}" sensor			XF1													
Bridge	^{2}/_{3}" sensor		X-S1 ^{f}														
Type	Lens																
Type	Lens	2011	2012	2013	2014	2015	2016	2017	2018	2019	2020	2021	2022	2023	2024	2025	2026
