= Fujifilm X-S20 =

2023 APS-C mirrorless camera

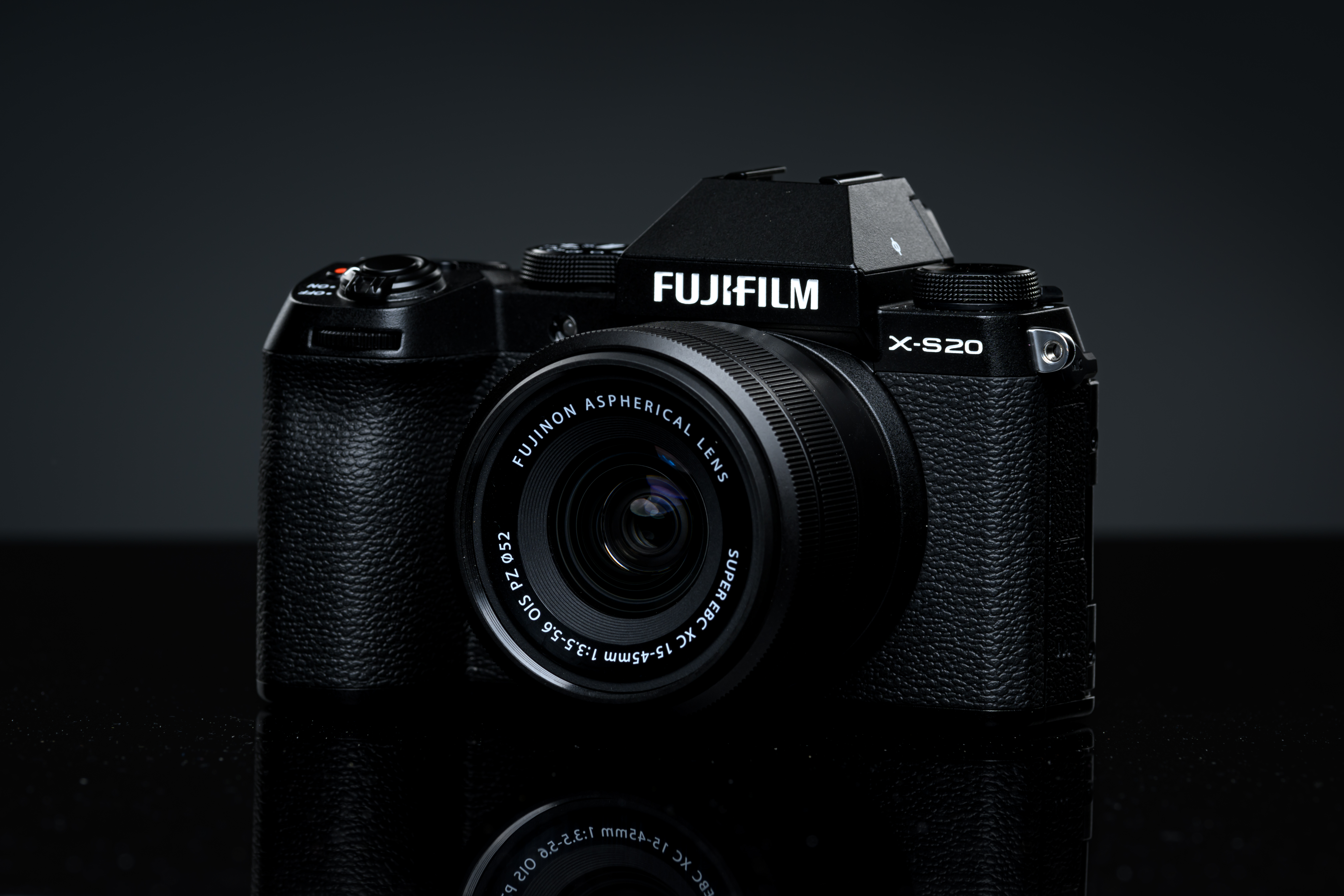
- X-S20 + XC 15-45mm f/3.5-5.6 OIS PZ

Overview
- Maker: Fujifilm
- Type: MILC
- Released: June 30, 2023; 2 years ago
- Intro price: JPY 204600(body); USD 1299(body)

Lens
- Lens mount: Fujifilm X
- Lens: Interchangeable lens
- Compatible lenses: Fujinon

Sensor/medium
- Sensor: APS-C
- Sensor type: X-Trans CMOS 4
- Sensor size: 23.5 mm × 15.6 mm
- Sensor maker: Sony
- Maximum resolution: 26.1 megapixels 6240 × 4160
- Film speed: 160–12800 (standard); 80–51200 (extended)
- Storage media: SD, SDHC, SDXC, UHS-II

Focusing
- Focus: Intelligent Hybrid AF; TTL contrast AF / TTL phase detection AF
- Focus modes: Single point, Zone, Wide/Tracking, All
- Focus areas: 425 focus point
- Focus bracketing: Frames: 1 - 999, Step: 1-10, Interval: 0 - 10s

Exposure/metering
- Exposure: TTL 256-zone metering
- Exposure bracketing: AE Bracketing (Frames: 2, 3, 5, 7, 9; Step: 1/3EV step adjustment, up to ±5EV on stills, ±2EV on video)
- Exposure modes: Program AE, Aperture Priority AE, Shutter Speed Priority AE, Manual Exposure
- Exposure metering: Through-the-lens
- Metering modes: Multi, Spot, Average, Center Weighted

Flash
- Flash: Manual pop-up flash Guidenumber 5
- Flash synchronization: 1/180 s
- Compatible flashes: TTL Flash compatible

Shutter
- Shutter: Focal Plane Shutter
- Shutter speeds: 4 s to 1/4000 s (mechanical), 4 s to 1/32000 s (electronic)
- Continuous shooting: 8.0 fps (mechanical); 20.0 fps (electronic); 30.0 fps (electronic 1.25× crop)

Viewfinder
- Viewfinder: EVF viewfinder with eye sensor
- Electronic viewfinder: 0.39" 2.36M dots (3:2. 1080×720) OLED
- Viewfinder magnification: 0.62× with 50 mm lens (35 mm format equivalent)
- Frame coverage: 100%

Image processing
- Image processor: X-Processor 5
- White balance: Auto, Custom, Preset, Fluorescent, Incandescent, Underwater
- WB bracketing: ±1, ±2, ±3,
- Dynamic range bracketing: AUTO, 100%, 200%, 400%

General
- Video recording: 6.2K, 4K, 1080p
- LCD screen: 3.0" 1.84M dots (3:2. 720×480) touchscreen free-angle monitor
- Battery: NP-W235 Li-ion (USB rechargeable)
- AV port(s): HDMI D, ⌀3.5mm audio jack for mic & headphone
- Data port: USB-C 3.2, Wi-Fi 5, Bluetooth 4.2
- Body features: In-Body Image Stabilization, Magnesium alloy body with a leather wrap
- Dimensions: 127.7 mm × 85.1 mm × 65.4 mm (5.03 in × 3.35 in × 2.57 in)
- Weight: 491 g (17 oz) (1.082 lb) including battery and memory card
- Made in: Indonesia

Chronology
- Predecessor: Fujifilm X-S10

The Fujifilm X-S20 is a mid-range mirrorless interchangeable-lens camera announced on May 24, 2023. This is a successor to the 2020 X-S10. It has a backside-illuminated X-Trans CMOS 4 APS-C sensor, the X-Processor 5, In-Body Image Stabilization(IBIS) and uses the Fujifilm X-mount. It's touted as an excellent hybrid camera, offering great performance for photography and videography.

== Key features ==
- In-Body Image Stabilization, capable of up to 7.0 stops
- 23.5mm x 15.6mm (APS-C) X-Trans CMOS 4 with primary color filter
- X-Processor 5
- 26.1 megapixels
- 23.5 mm × 15.7 mm CMOS sensor (APS-C).
- Improved AF with Deep-Learning Technology
- Fully-articulate touchscreen
- 14bit RAW image capture (6240 × 4160)
- Panorama capture, vertical (2160 × 9600) & horizontal (9600 × 1440)
- 6.2K open gate recording (capturing the entire sensor or 6240×4160, 3:2) at 30fps, 4K (3840×2160, 16:9) and DCI 4K (4096×2160, 17:9) video up to 60fps, and FHD (1920×1080, 16:9) at up to 240fps (over 60fps is 'High Speed Recording' without audio)
- Cooling fan FAN-001 extends continuous record times to more than double.
- Wi-Fi and Bluetooth connectivity
- USB-C, HDMI-D, 3.5mm audio jack
- Large grip
- Pop-up flash
- PASM mode dial, front and rear command dials, and film simulation selection dial, VLOG setting in mode dial

== Details ==
Compared to its predecessor, the X-S20 features many improvements, particularly those highlighted by Fujifilm themselves:

- New X-Trans Processor 5 provides faster sensor read out, better autofocus, and less energy use
- more film Simulations
- VLOG setting on mode dial
- Product review mode
- Support for external fan module to increase movie record times
- Separate microphone and headphone ports
- Higher capacity NP-W235 battery for more than double the CIPA rating
- Much more advanced video features such as 6K open gate 10-bit internal recording as well as Raw 12-bit video output via HDMI
- F-Log2 video recording
- Improved IBIS with 7 stops of stabilization (up from 6)

Film simulations:

- PROVIA STANDARD
- VELVIA VIVID
- ASTIA SOFT
- CLASSIC CHROME
- REALA ACE
- Pro Neg Hi
- Pro Neg Std
- Classic Neg
- Nostalgic Neg
- ETERNA CINEMA
- ETERNA BLEACH BYPASS
- ACROS
- MONOCHROME
- SEPIA

Type	Lens	2011	2012	2013	2014	2015	2016	2017	2018	2019	2020	2021	2022	2023	2024	2025
MILC	G-mount; Medium format sensor							GFX 50S ^{F} ^{T}					GFX 50S II ^{F} ^{T}			
MILC	G-mount; Medium format sensor									GFX 50R ^{F} ^{T}						
MILC	G-mount; Medium format sensor										GFX 100 ^{F} ^{T}					GFX 100 II ^{F} ^{T}
MILC	G-mount; Medium format sensor											GFX 100 IR ^{F} ^{T}				
MILC	G-mount; Medium format sensor											GFX 100S ^{F} ^{T}				GFX 100S II^{F} ^{T}
MILC	G-mount; Medium format sensor															GFX Eterna 55^{F} ^{T}
MILC	Prime lens Medium format sensor															GFX 100RF ^{F} ^{T}
MILC	X-mount; APS-C sensor		X-Pro1				X-Pro2				X-Pro3 ^{f} ^{T}					
MILC	X-mount; APS-C sensor								X-H1 ^{F} ^{T}					X-H2 ^{A} ^{T}		
MILC	X-mount; APS-C sensor													X-H2S ^{A} ^{T}		
MILC	X-mount; APS-C sensor											X-S10 ^{A} ^{T}			X-S20 ^{A} ^{T}	
MILC	X-mount; APS-C sensor				X-T1 ^{f}			X-T2 ^{F}		X-T3 ^{F} ^{T}		X-T4 ^{A} ^{T}		X-T5 ^{F} ^{T}		
MILC	X-mount; APS-C sensor						X-T10 ^{f}	X-T20 ^{f} ^{T}		X-T30 ^{f} ^{T}			X-T30 II ^{f} ^{T}			X-T50 ^{f} ^{T}
MILC	X-mount; APS-C sensor									_{15} X-T100 ^{F} ^{T}	X-T200 ^{A} ^{T}					X-T30 III ^{f} ^{T}
MILC	X-mount; APS-C sensor			X-E1	X-E2		X-E2s		X-E3 ^{T}			X-E4 ^{f} ^{T}				X-E5 ^{f} ^{T}
MILC	X-mount; APS-C sensor				X-M1 ^{f}											X-M5 ^{A} ^{T}
MILC	X-mount; APS-C sensor				X-A1 ^{f}	X-A2 ^{f}		X-A3 ^{f} ^{T}	_{15} X-A5 ^{f} ^{T}		X-A7 ^{A} ^{T}					
MILC	X-mount; APS-C sensor							X-A10 ^{f}	X-A20 ^{f} ^{T}							
Compact	Prime lens APS-C sensor	X100		X100S		X100T		X100F			X100V ^{f} ^{T}				X100VI ^{f} ^{T}	
Compact	Prime lens APS-C sensor						X70 ^{f} ^{T}			XF10 ^{T}						
Compact	Prime lens 1" sensor															X half ^{T}
Compact	Zoom lens^{2}/_{3}" sensor		X10	X20		X30 ^{f}										
Compact	Zoom lens^{2}/_{3}" sensor				XQ1	XQ2										
Compact	Zoom lens^{2}/_{3}" sensor			XF1												
Bridge	^{2}/_{3}" sensor		X-S1 ^{f}													
Type	Lens															
Type	Lens	2011	2012	2013	2014	2015	2016	2017	2018	2019	2020	2021	2022	2023	2024	2025
