= Tatsuo Suzuki (photographer) =

Japanese street photographer (born 1965)

- 鈴木 達朗
- Born: 1965 (age 60–61); Tokyo, Japan
- Education: Waseda University
- Occupation: Street photographer
- Years active: 2008–present
- Awards: Photolux Award; ND Awards Photography Contest; STEIDL Book Award Japan

Tatsuo Suzuki (鈴木 達朗, Suzuki Tatsurō; born 1965) is a Japanese street photographer based in Tokyo. He is known for his, at times controversial, black-and-white street photography of pedestrians, specifically in Shibuya ward.

== Early life and education ==
Suzuki was born in Tokyo but moved all throughout Tokyo Prefecture due to his father's occupation. In the 1980s, he studied law at Waseda University; as a college student, he was a guitarist for a punk band.

In 1990, Suzuki worked in the sales department at Fujitsu. During his time there, he noted that he "began to forget how to express my emotions, energy, imagination." He quit his job in 2014 to focus more on photography.

== Career ==
At the age of 43, Suzuki began taking photography as a hobby in 2008. He attended the "Resist" school of photography run by Mayasuki Yoshinaga and Daidō Moriyama. There, he learned to concentrate on "personal artistic expression rather than the technical elements surrounding photography."

In 2013, Suzuki won in the PhotoVogue section of the Photolux Award. A few years later, in 2016, he won the STEIDL Book Award Japan, after which he received support to publish a photo book. As a result, in 2019, Suzuki began a bimonthly magazine called Friction/Tokyo Street aimed at showcasing black-and-white photographs of Tokyo and its pedestrians. Friction/Tokyo Street released its fifth and final zine in 2023. Other awards Suzuki has won for his street photography include the ND Awards Photography Contest, the International Photography Award, among others.

In 2017, Suzuki founded Void Tokyo, a photography and zine collective dedicated to producing "an extensive archive of Tokyo." As of 2023, Void Tokyo had 11 members. Suzuki's works have additionally been curated by members of Japan's punk underground, such as Harris Elliott's Punk In Translation exhibition in 2016. In 2023, Suzuki headlined the Light Leaks Festival, formerly known as the Luxembourg Street Photography Festival.

== Style ==
Suzuki's work has been described as spontaneous, eccentric, and raw, in particular due to his confrontational and impromptu way of capturing subjects on the ground as a street photographer. He named Robert Frank's monograph, The Americans, as an influence on his "gritty scenes" of Tokyo. In 2014, Exif data identified the Fujifilm X-E2 as Suzuki's most used camera of choice.

In BuzzFeed News, Suzuki stated that he captures "everything" as time allows and looks for "good moments" as he walks around Tokyo, generally taking around 2,000 shots a day. He also stated that he mostly takes photographs without communication but sometimes calls out to pedestrians and/or asks them for permission. He noted that Shibuya was his main location for street photography, specifically before sunset, though his work has additionally taken place in Shinjuku, Yokohama, Kōenji, Gotanda, Ōta, and other parts of the city.

Pen stated: "Tatsuo succeeds brilliantly at translating all the power of a being through his street photography, which provides a very sincere expression of emotional states captured on the spot, all of which are different but often harrowing."

The Eye of Photography wrote that "Suzuki captures the spontaneous gestures, glimpses and abstractions that comprise the best street photography."

BuzzFeed News assigned Suzuki's work a "punk rock feel" and stated that "His haunting images of passersby display a keen eye for details and convey a totally unique view of Tokyo."

My Modern Met wrote that "Suzuki's photos paint a picture of a lively, almost chaotic, metropolis. Armed with his camera, an eye for composition, and an impeccable sense of timing, the photographer creates a stunning visual collection of the eclectic characters who live in his city."

== Controversy ==
Suzuki was formerly an "X-Photographer," or ambassador, for Fujifilm. In 2020, Fujifilm released a seven-minute promotional video showcasing Suzuki's process of taking street photography with the new Fujifilm X100V. The promotion drew controversy for depicting Suzuki's "darting through crowds while taking photographs before quickly slipping away." In response to backlash, Fujifilm removed the promotional video and took Suzuki off of their roster of X-Photographers. Upon facing personal outcry on the internet, Suzuki deleted his Twitter account shortly after.

The controversy led to debates about the ethics of street photography. Many publications called it "aggressive," "shocking," and "intrusive." PetaPixel compared Suzuki's method to that of Bruce Gilden, an American street photographer known for being "brash" and "obnoxious." Samuel Lintaro Hopf, a photographer and collaborator of Suzuki's, stated that "Suzuki is one of very few photographers I know who is working fully for their art without compromises. His approach is an accumulation of years of working on the street, and he doesn’t hold back. I can respect that from the point of view of another street photographer."

== Awards ==
- Photolux Award, PhotoVogue Section, 2013
- International Photography Awards, Lifestyle Category, Finalist, 2014
- ND Awards Photography Contest, First Place, 2015
- STEIDL Book Award Japan, 2016
- Lens Culture Street Photography Awards, Finalist, 2016
