= Fujifilm X-E4 =

2021 mirrorless camera model

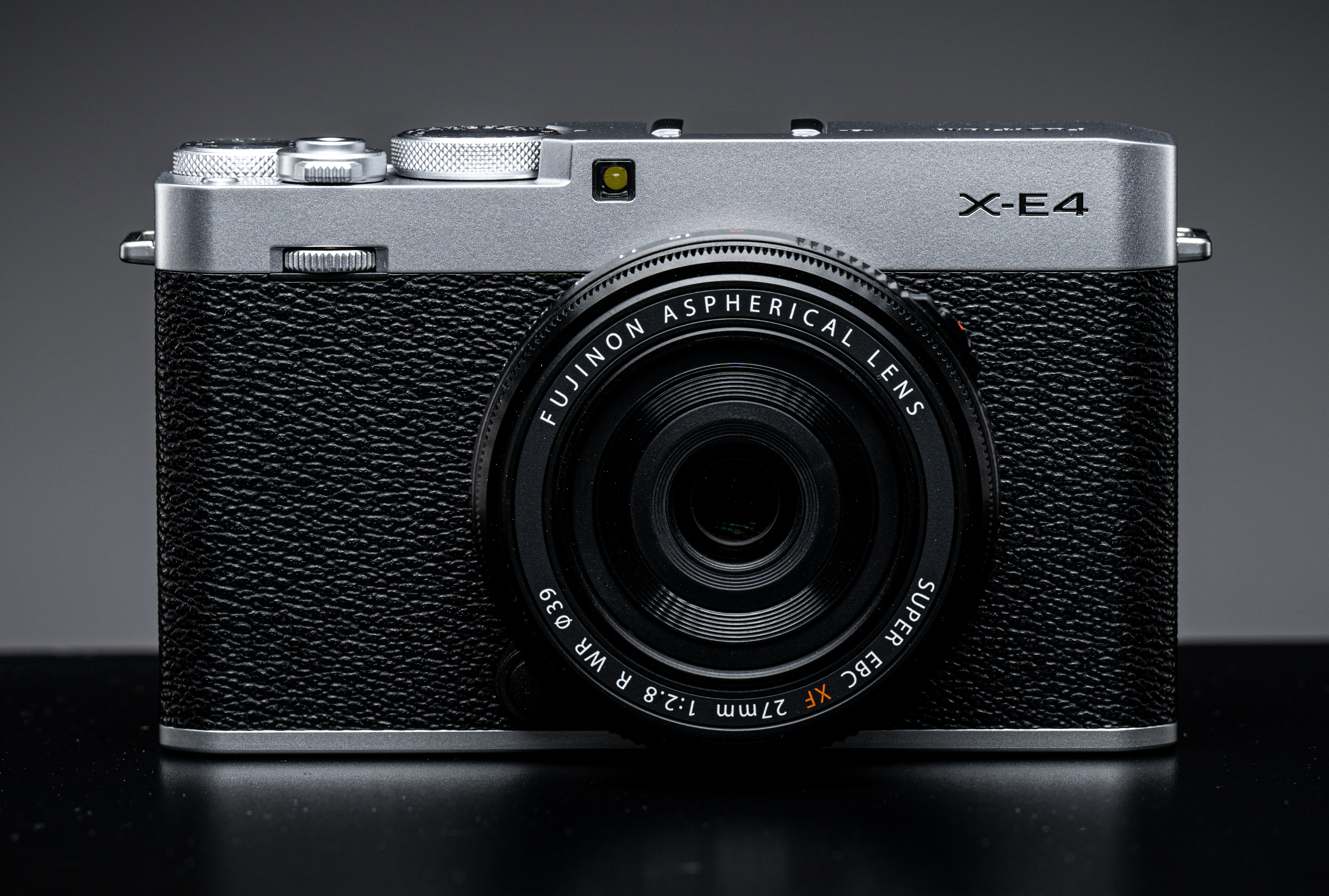
- X-E4 + XF 27mm f/2.8 R WR

Overview
- Maker: Fujifilm
- Type: MILC
- Released: 25 February 2021; 5 years ago
- Intro price: USD 850 (body), USD 1050 (kit)

Lens
- Lens mount: Fujifilm X
- Lens: Interchangeable lens
- Compatible lenses: Fujinon

Sensor/medium
- Sensor: APS-C
- Sensor type: X-Trans CMOS 4
- Sensor size: 23.5 mm × 15.6 mm
- Sensor maker: Sony
- Maximum resolution: 26.1 megapixels 6240 x 4160
- Film speed: 160–12800 (standard); 80–51200 (extend)
- Storage media: SD, SDHC, SDXC, UHS-I

Focusing
- Focus: Intelligent Hybrid AF; TTL contrast AF / TTL phase detection AF
- Focus modes: Single point, Zone, Wide/Tracking
- Focus areas: 117 focus point

Exposure/metering
- Exposure: TTL 256-zone metering
- Exposure modes: Program AE, Aperture Priority AE, Shutter Speed Priority AE, Manual Exposure
- Exposure metering: Through-the-lens
- Metering modes: Multi, Spot, Average, Center Weighted

Flash
- Flash: External flash
- Flash synchronization: 1/180 s
- Compatible flashes: TTL Flash compatible

Shutter
- Shutter: Focal Plane Shutter
- Shutter speeds: 4 s to 1/4000 s (mechanical), 4 s to 1/32000 s (electronic)
- Continuous shooting: 30.0 fps

Viewfinder
- Viewfinder: EVF viewfinder with eye sensor
- Electronic viewfinder: 0.39" 2.36M dots OLED
- Viewfinder magnification: 0.62
- Frame coverage: 100%

Image processing
- Image processor: X-Processor 4
- White balance: Auto, Custom, Preset, Fluorescent, Incandescent, Underwater
- WB bracketing: ±1, ±2, ±3
- Dynamic range bracketing: 100%, 200%, 400%

General
- Video recording: MP4, MOV; 4K up to 30 fps, 1080p up to 240 fps
- LCD screen: 3.0" 1.62M dots touchscreen tilting monitor
- Battery: NP-W126S Li-ion
- AV port(s): HDMI D, ⌀3.5 mm audio jack
- Data port: USB-C 3.2, Wi-Fi 4, Bluetooth 4.2
- Body features: Ultra Sonic Vibration Sensor Cleaning System
- Dimensions: 121.3 mm × 72.9 mm × 32.7 mm (4.78 in × 2.87 in × 1.29 in)
- Weight: 364 g (13 oz) (0.802 lb) including battery and memory card
- Made in: Indonesia

Chronology
- Predecessor: Fujifilm X-E3
- Successor: Fujifilm X-E5

The Fujifilm X-E4 is a digital rangefinder-style mirrorless camera by Fujifilm. The camera was announced on January 27, 2021, at the X Summit Global 2021 together with the GFX100S. It is part of the company's X-series range of cameras positioned for enthusiast photographers. It was released in March 2021.

The Fujifilm X-E4 is thinner than the X-E3 by a centimeter. Unlike its predecessor, the grip of the new camera has been removed. The camera consists of the same 26.1-megapixel, back-side illuminated but with a newer processor, the X-Trans CMOS 4 sensor which is also found in FujiFilm's flagship cameras.

The camera has a 180° forward-tilting LCD touchscreen. The camera is able to record at 4K/30p and Full-HD/240 fps videos.

In September 2022, major Japanese retailers started listing the Fujifilm X-E4 as discontinued.

The camera system was plagued by availability issues, perhaps due to COVID-19 supply chain issues.

== Key features ==
- 26MP APS-C sensor with X-Trans color filter array
- 3.0" tilting touchscreen with 1.62M dots (can tilt up 180 degrees)
- 4K at 30fps and Full HD at 240 fps videos
- 8 fps burst shooting with mechanical shutter (20 fps with electronic)
- CIPA rated to 380 shots per charge
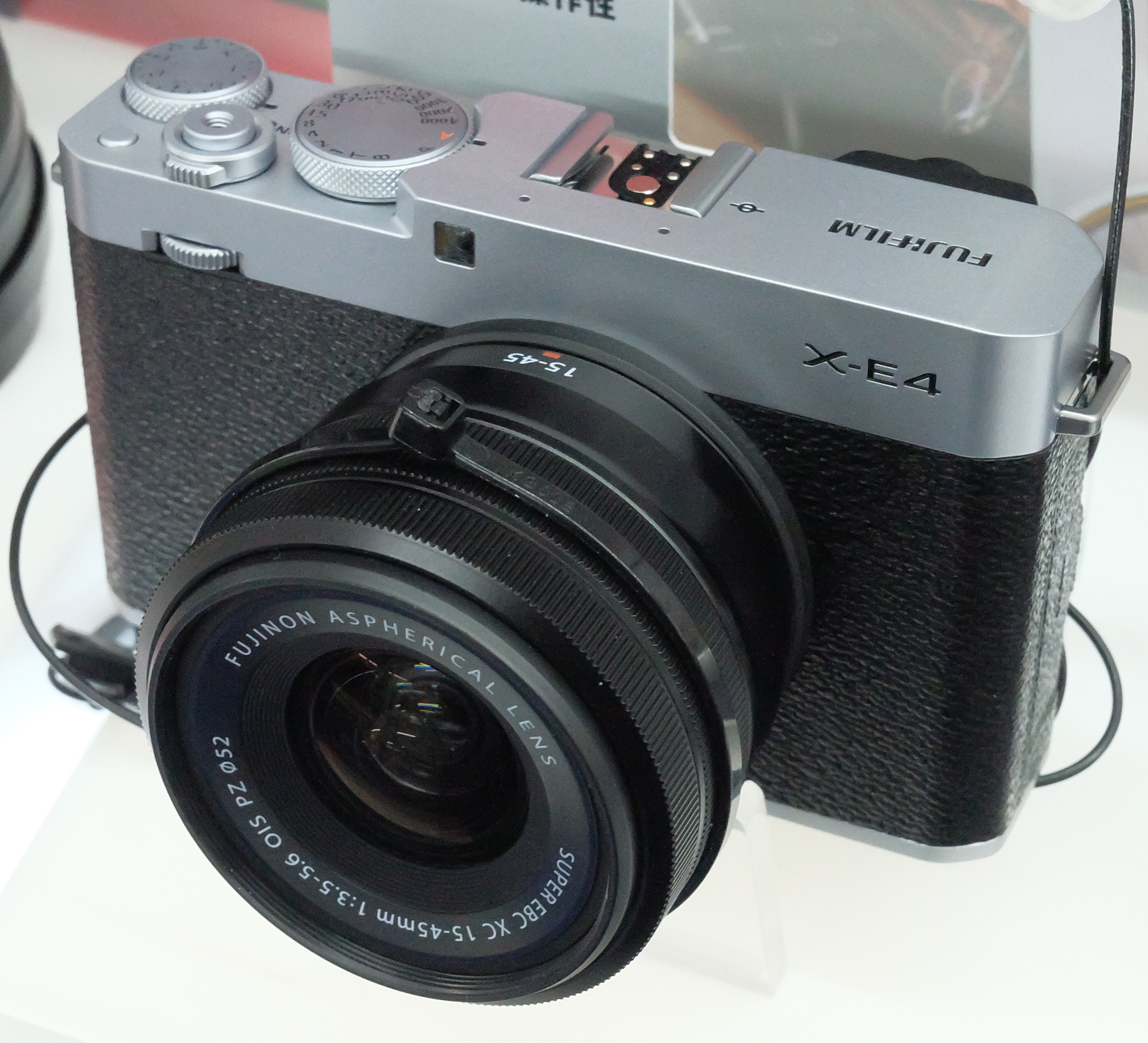

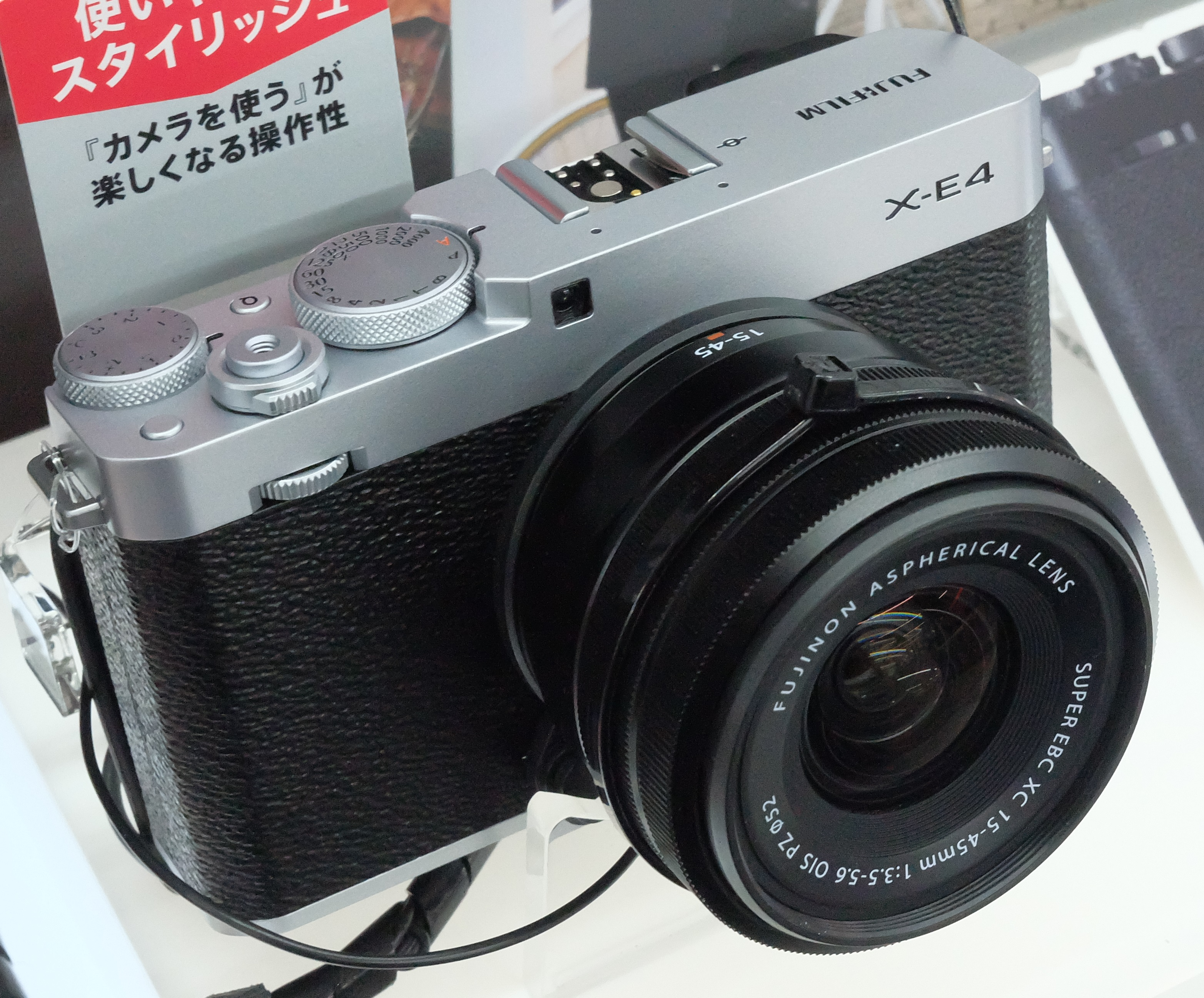

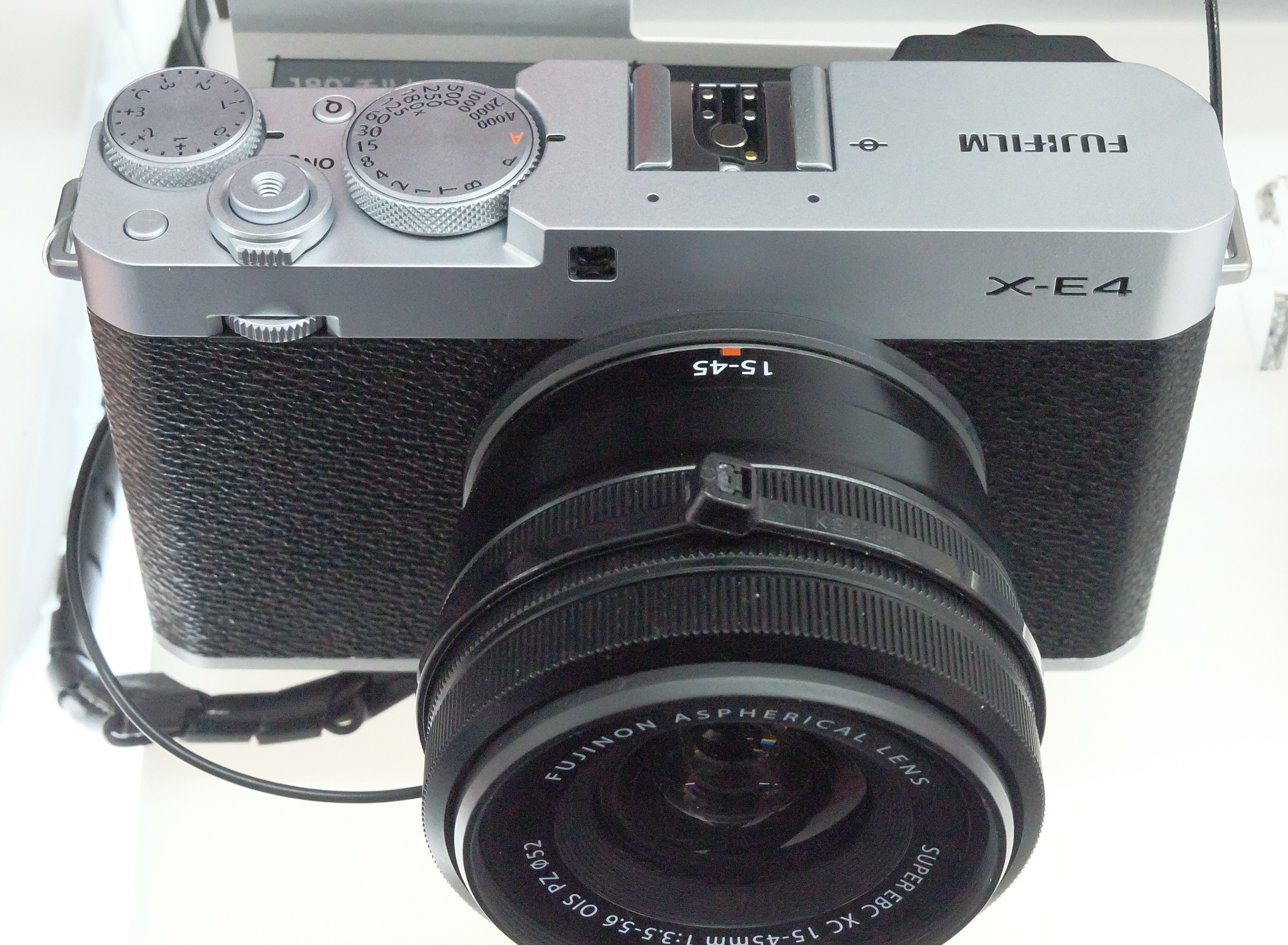

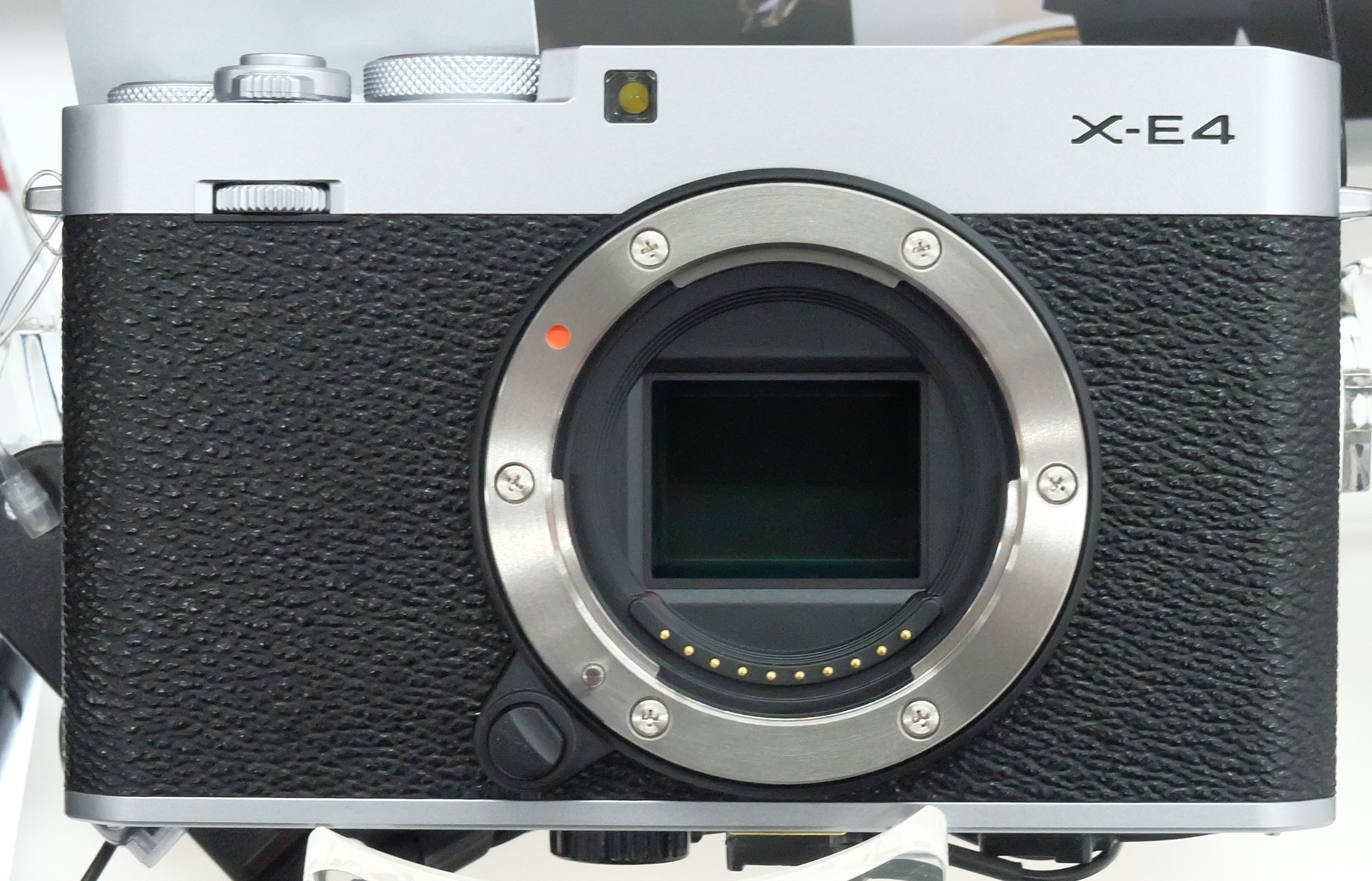

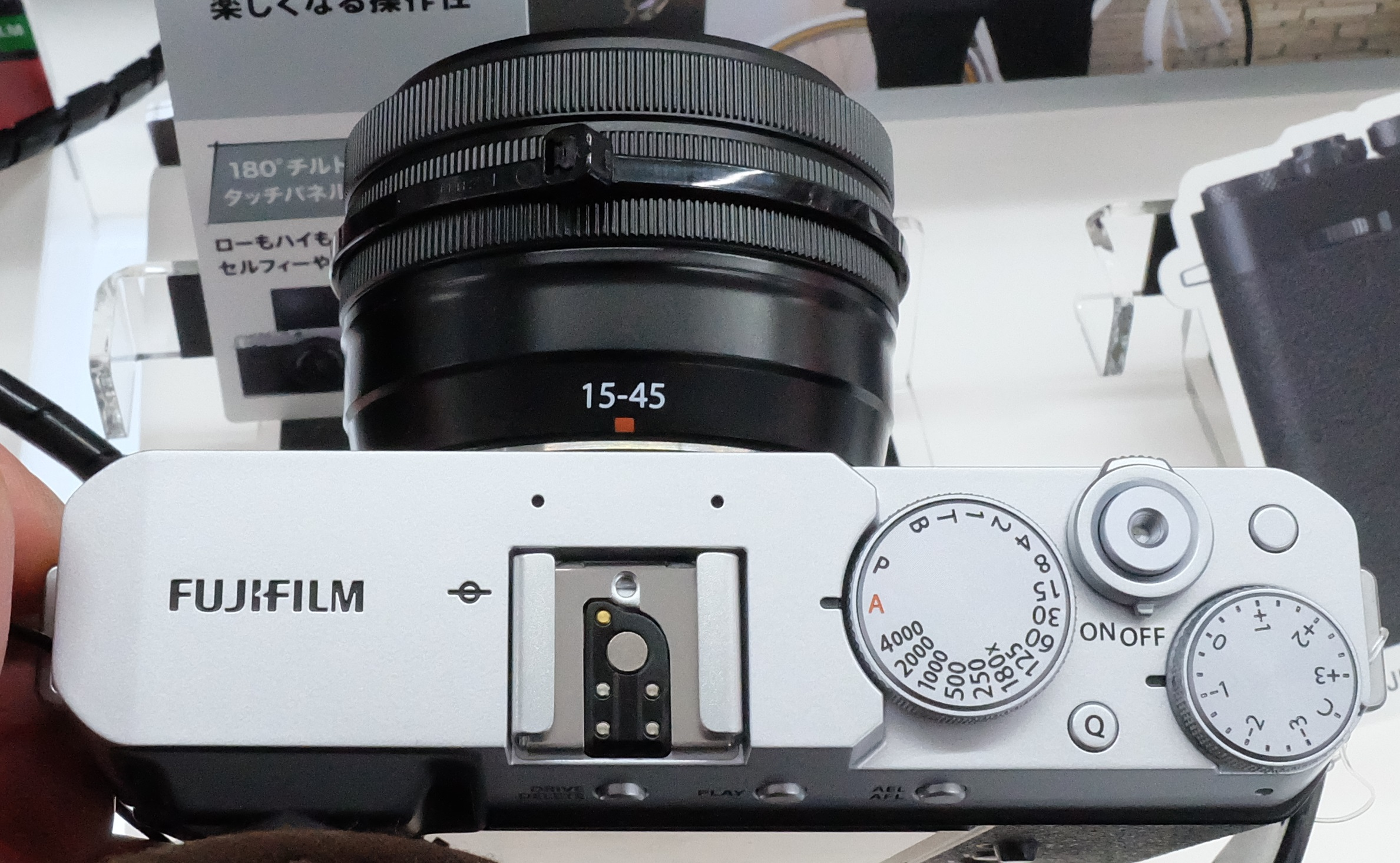

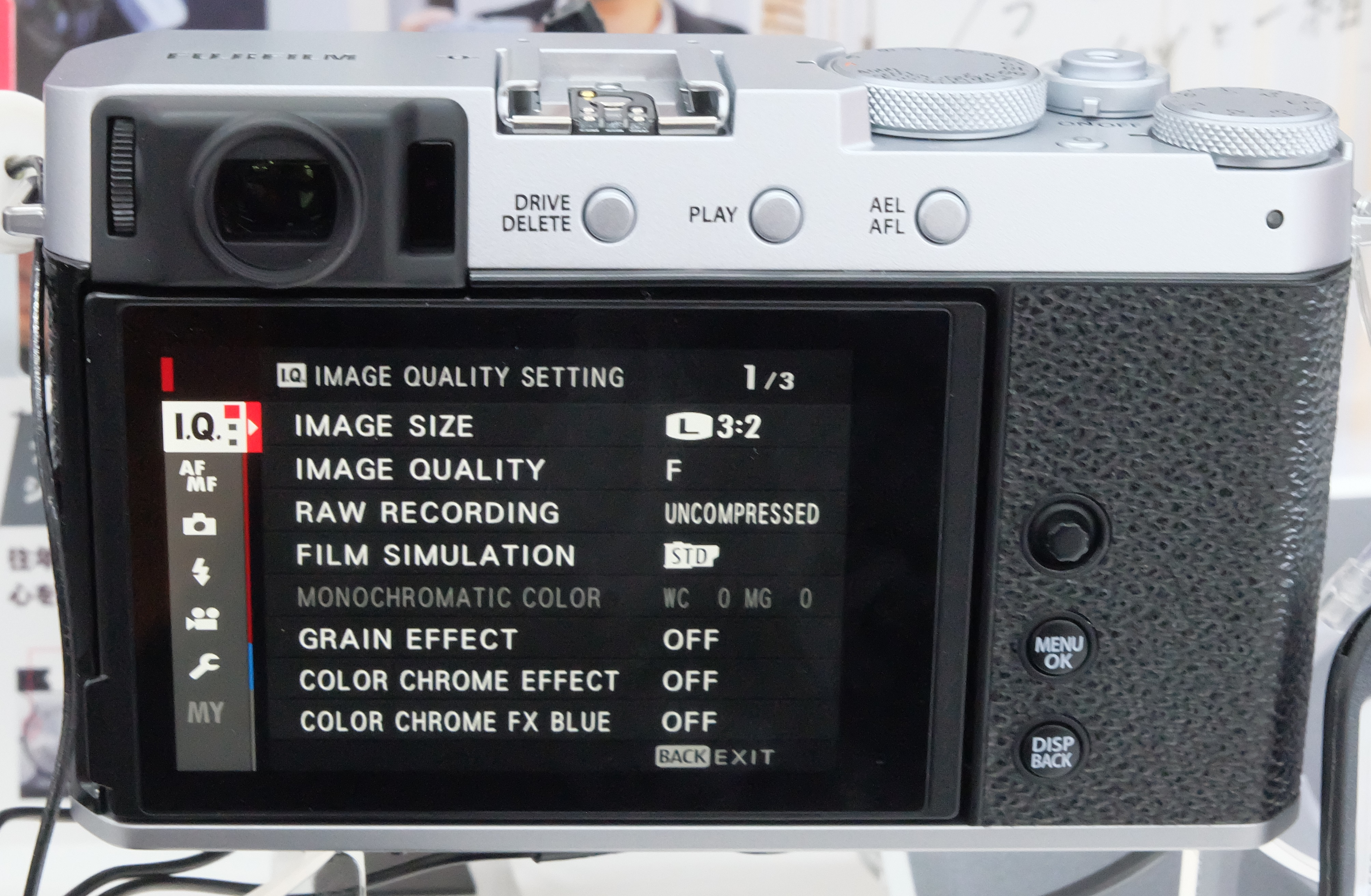

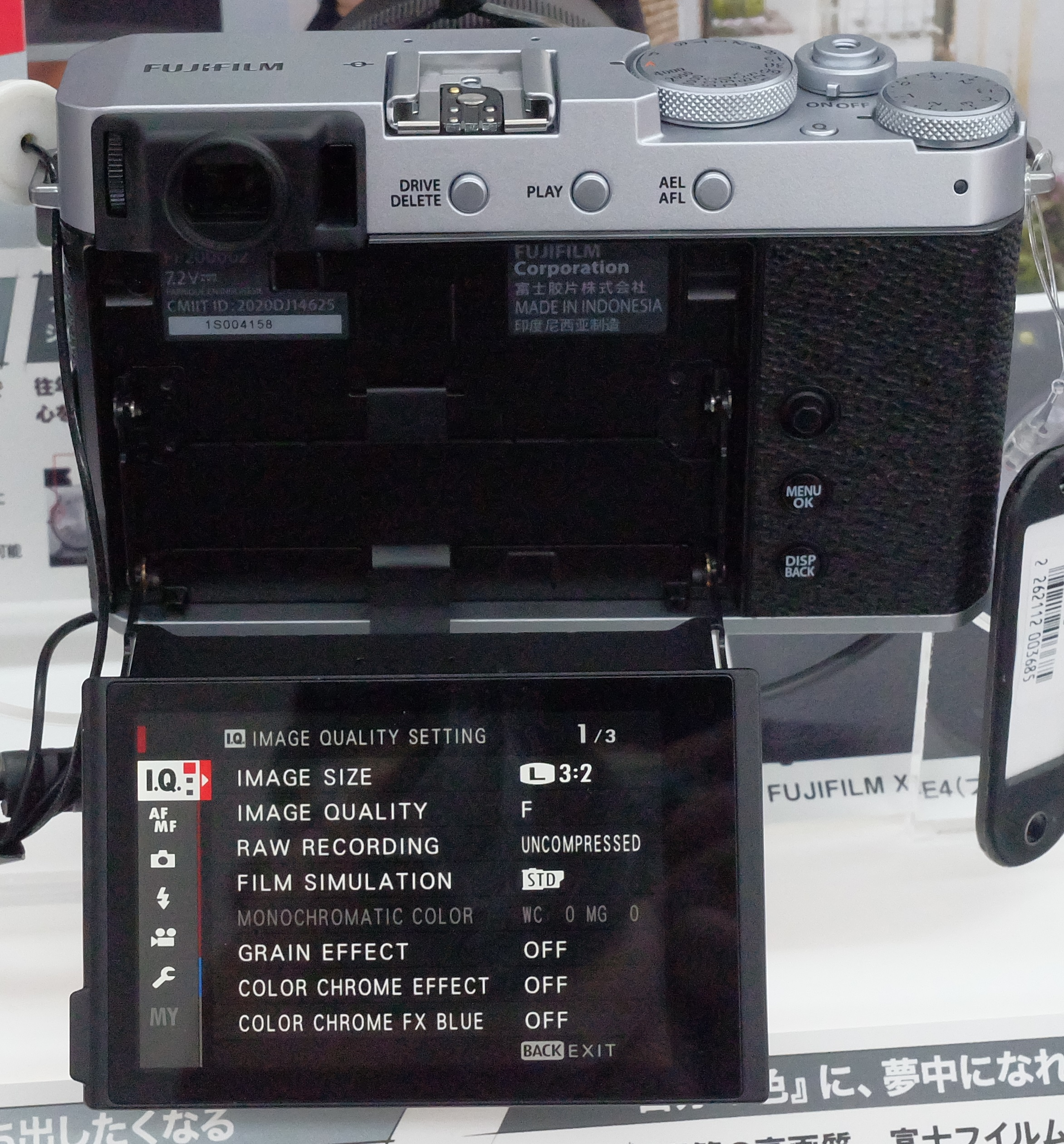

== See also ==
- Fujifilm X series
- Fujifilm cameras
- List of retro-style digital cameras

Type	Lens	2011	2012	2013	2014	2015	2016	2017	2018	2019	2020	2021	2022	2023	2024	2025	2026
MILC	G-mount; Medium format sensor							GFX 50S ^{F} ^{T}					GFX 50S II ^{F} ^{T}				
MILC	G-mount; Medium format sensor									GFX 50R ^{F} ^{T}							
MILC	G-mount; Medium format sensor										GFX 100 ^{F} ^{T}					GFX 100 II ^{F} ^{T}	
MILC	G-mount; Medium format sensor											GFX 100 IR ^{F} ^{T}					
MILC	G-mount; Medium format sensor											GFX 100S ^{F} ^{T}				GFX 100S II ^{F} ^{T}	
MILC	G-mount; Medium format sensor															GFX Eterna 55 ^{F} ^{T}	
MILC	Prime lens Medium format sensor															GFX 100RF ^{F} ^{T}	
MILC	X-mount; APS-C sensor		X-Pro1				X-Pro2				X-Pro3 ^{f} ^{T}						
MILC	X-mount; APS-C sensor								X-H1 ^{F} ^{T}					X-H2 ^{A} ^{T}			
MILC	X-mount; APS-C sensor													X-H2S ^{A} ^{T}			
MILC	X-mount; APS-C sensor											X-S10 ^{A} ^{T}			X-S20 ^{A} ^{T}		
MILC	X-mount; APS-C sensor				X-T1 ^{f}			X-T2 ^{F}		X-T3 ^{F} ^{T}		X-T4 ^{A} ^{T}		X-T5 ^{F} ^{T}			
MILC	X-mount; APS-C sensor															X-T50 ^{f} ^{T}	
MILC	X-mount; APS-C sensor						X-T10 ^{f}	X-T20 ^{f} ^{T}		X-T30 ^{f} ^{T}			X-T30 II ^{f} ^{T}			X-T30 III ^{f} ^{T}	
MILC	X-mount; APS-C sensor									_{15} X-T100 ^{F} ^{T}	X-T200 ^{A} ^{T}						
MILC	X-mount; APS-C sensor			X-E1	X-E2		X-E2s		X-E3 ^{T}			X-E4 ^{f} ^{T}				X-E5 ^{f} ^{T}	
MILC	X-mount; APS-C sensor				X-M1 ^{f}											X-M5 ^{A} ^{T}	
MILC	X-mount; APS-C sensor				X-A1 ^{f}	X-A2 ^{f}		X-A3 ^{f} ^{T}	_{15} X-A5 ^{f} ^{T}		X-A7 ^{A} ^{T}						
MILC	X-mount; APS-C sensor							X-A10 ^{f}	X-A20 ^{f} ^{T}								
Compact	Prime lens APS-C sensor	X100		X100S		X100T		X100F			X100V ^{f} ^{T}				X100VI ^{f} ^{T}		
Compact	Prime lens APS-C sensor						X70 ^{f} ^{T}			XF10 ^{T}							
Compact	Prime lens 1" sensor															X half ^{T}	
Compact	Zoom lens^{2}/_{3}" sensor		X10	X20		X30 ^{f}											
Compact	Zoom lens^{2}/_{3}" sensor				XQ1	XQ2											
Compact	Zoom lens^{2}/_{3}" sensor			XF1													
Bridge	^{2}/_{3}" sensor		X-S1 ^{f}														
Type	Lens																
Type	Lens	2011	2012	2013	2014	2015	2016	2017	2018	2019	2020	2021	2022	2023	2024	2025	2026
