= Fujifilm X-E5 =

2025 Mirrorless digital camera by Fujifilm

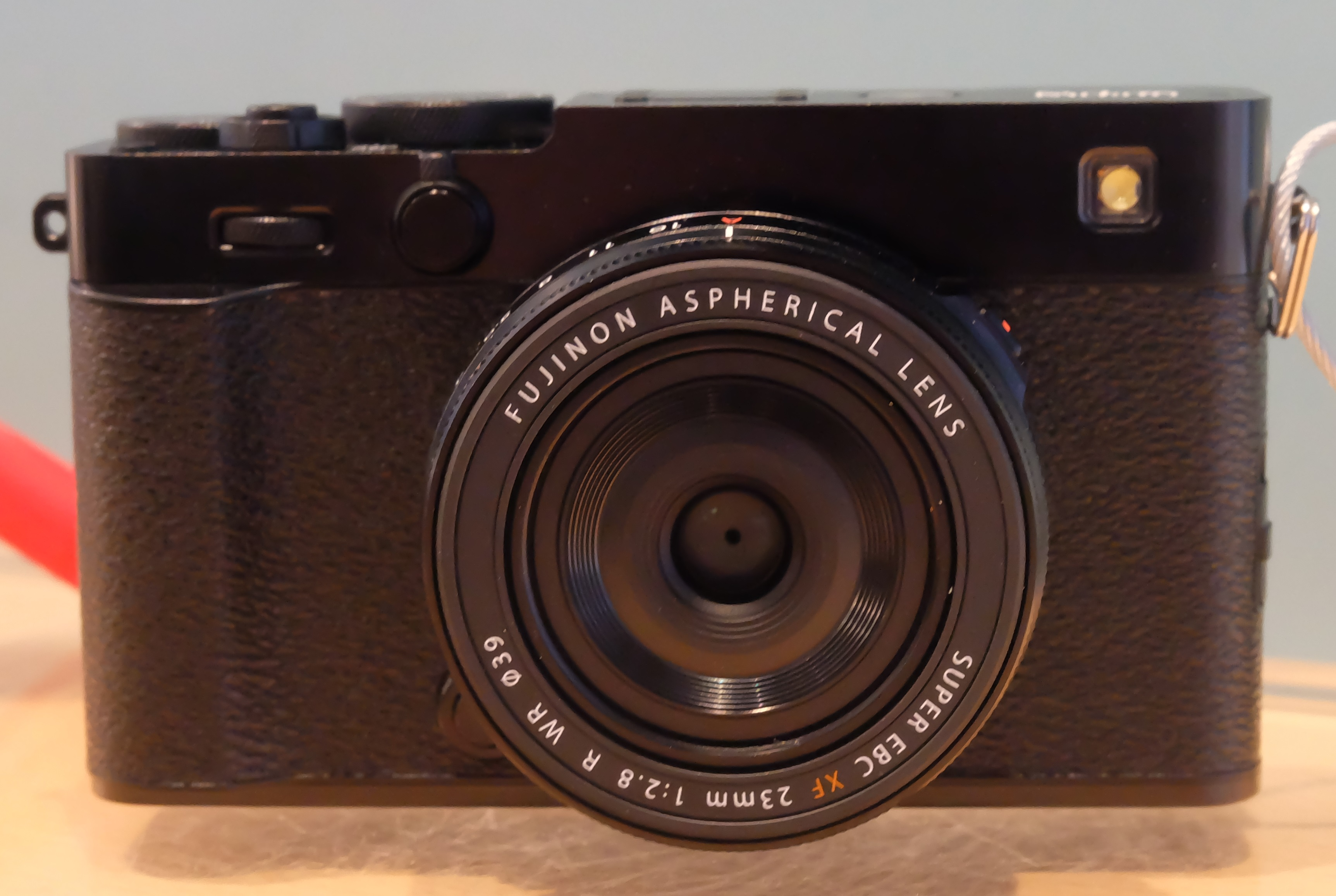
- X-E5 with XF 23mm f/2.8 R WR lens

Overview
- Maker: Fujifilm
- Type: Mirrorless interchangeable lens camera
- Released: 12 June 2025; 15 months ago (announced); 28 August 2025; 12 months ago (release)
- Intro price: USD 1,699; EUR 1,549; JPY 246,400 (body only)

Lens
- Lens mount: Fujifilm X-mount
- Lens: Interchangeable
- Compatible lenses: Fujinon

Sensor/medium
- Sensor: APS-C
- Sensor type: X-Trans CMOS 5 HR
- Sensor size: 23.5 × 15.7 mm
- Sensor maker: Sony Semiconductor Manufacturing Corporation
- Maximum resolution: 40.2 megapixels (7728 × 5152)
- Film speed: ISO 125–12800 (standard); ISO 64–51200 (extended)
- Storage media: SD/SDHC/SDXC (UHS-II)

Focusing
- Focus: Hybrid autofocus system 425 focus points AI-based subject detection
- Focus modes: Single, Continuous, Manual
- Focus areas: 425 points

Exposure/metering
- Exposure: TTL 256-zone metering
- Exposure modes: Program, Aperture Priority, Shutter Priority, Manual
- Exposure metering: Multi, Spot, Average, Center-weighted

Flash
- Flash: None (Hot shoe only)
- Compatible flashes: TTL Flash compatible

Shutter
- Shutter: Focal plane shutter
- Shutter speeds: 15 min to 1/4000 s (mechanical); 15 min to 1/180000 s (electronic)
- Continuous shooting: 8 fps (mechanical), 13 fps (electronic), 20 fps (1.29x crop)

Viewfinder
- Viewfinder: Electronic viewfinder
- Electronic viewfinder: 0.39-inch OLED, 2.36 million dots
- Viewfinder magnification: 0.62×
- Frame coverage: 100%

Image processing
- Image processor: X-Processor 5
- White balance: Auto, Custom, Preset (multiple options)
- WB bracketing: ±1, ±2, ±3

General
- Video recording: 6.2K 30p 4K 60p Full HD 240p 4:2:2 10-bit internal recording
- LCD screen: 3.0-inch tilting touchscreen 1.84 million dots (180-degree tilt)
- Battery: NP-W126S Li-ion (USB-PD rechargeable)
- AV port(s): HDMI Micro, 3.5mm microphone input
- Data port(s): USB-C, Wi-Fi 802.11ac, Bluetooth 4.2
- Body features: 5-axis IBIS (up to 7.0 stops); Sensor cleaning system
- Dimensions: 124.9 mm × 72.9 mm × 39.1 mm (4.92 in × 2.87 in × 1.54 in)
- Weight: 445 g (16 oz) (0.981 lb) (with battery and memory card)
- Made in: PR China (WW); Japan (for US)

Chronology
- Predecessor: Fujifilm X-E4

The Fujifilm X-E5 is a mirrorless interchangeable lens camera announced by Fujifilm on June 12, 2025, as part of the company's X-series lineup. Released on August 28, 2025, it succeeds the Fujifilm X-E4, which was discontinued in 2022 after a brief production run.

== Overview ==
The X-E5 represents a significant repositioning of the X-E series from its budget-oriented predecessor to a more premium mid-range offering. According to DPReview, the camera "takes several steps back towards the enthusiast-friendly outlook of the original X-E models" after the divisive minimalist design of the X-E4.

Photography publications have noted the camera's positioning as an interchangeable-lens alternative to the popular Fujifilm X100VI, sharing many of its internals but offering lens flexibility. TechRadar described it as elevating "the retro series to mid-range status with some classy upgrades."

== Design and construction ==
The X-E5 features what reviewers have described as a significant build quality improvement over its predecessor. It is the first X-series camera to feature a precision-machined aluminum top plate cut from a single block. Digital Camera World noted that "the X-E4 felt a little cheap and hollow, but the X-E5 feels much more premium and solid, and is up there with the X-T5 and X-T50."

The camera maintains the rangefinder-style design characteristic of the X-E series, measuring 124.9 × 72.9 × 39.1 mm and weighing 445 grams with battery and memory card installed. Unlike some higher-end Fujifilm models, the X-E5 lacks weather sealing, which PetaPixel identified as a notable omission given its price point.

In November 2025, Fujifilm addressed a manufacturing defect on the camera's strap attachment, which detached from the body during use. According to the company, fewer than 0.1% of the units shipped had this issue.

=== Controls and interface ===
Following criticism of the X-E4's stripped-down controls, Fujifilm restored several physical controls on the X-E5, including a rear command dial and AF/MF switch. The camera introduces a film simulation dial with a unique circular window display that shows the selected simulation even when the camera is powered off.

A notable addition is a multi-function switch on the front panel, similar to that found on the X100VI, which provides access to five customizable functions. The camera includes a 3.0-inch tilting touchscreen LCD with 1.84 million dots that can tilt 180 degrees for self-portraits, and a 0.39-inch OLED electronic viewfinder with 2.36 million dots.

== Features and specifications ==
=== Image sensor and processing ===
The X-E5 employs a 40.2-megapixel APS-C X-Trans CMOS 5 HR sensor paired with the X-Processor 5, representing a significant resolution increase from the X-E4's 26.1-megapixel sensor. According to multiple reviews, this sensor and processor combination delivers image quality comparable to the X-T5 and X100VI. The camera supports ISO sensitivity from 125 to 12,800 in standard mode, expandable to ISO 64-51,200.

=== Autofocus and stabilization ===
The camera features a hybrid autofocus system with 425 selectable points and AI-powered subject detection capable of identifying and tracking animals, birds, automobiles, motorcycles, airplanes, and trains.

The X-E5 is the first camera in the X-E series to incorporate 5-axis in-body image stabilization (IBIS), rated at up to 7.0 stops of compensation according to CIPA standards. DPReview testing found the stabilization system to provide "approximately 6.5 stops of real-world benefit."

The X-E5 provides the pre-shot functionality.

=== Film simulations and recipes ===
A distinguishing feature is the dedicated film simulation dial that provides quick access to selected simulations plus three customizable "recipe" slots. Fuji X Weekly noted that Fujifilm has officially adopted the term "recipes" that originated from the user community, allowing users to save customized film simulation settings with adjusted parameters including grain effect, highlight and shadow response, clarity, and color chrome effects.

=== Video capabilities ===
The X-E5 supports video recording at multiple resolutions with 4:2:2 10-bit internal recording:

- 6.2K at 30 frames per second (with 1.23x crop)
- 4K at up to 60 frames per second
- Full HD at up to 240 frames per second

However, TechRadar noted that the camera "tends to overheat with extended video shooting" and lacks a dedicated headphone jack, suggesting it is "best thought of as a photography-first tool, with video as a very capable bonus feature."

== Market positioning and reception ==
=== Pricing and availability ===
The Fujifilm X-E5 was released on August 28, 2025, with a suggested retail price of US$1,699 for the body only and US$1,899 for a kit including the new XF 23mm f/2.8 R WR pancake lens. This represents a significant price increase from the X-E4's launch price of $850, positioning the X-E5 as a mid-range rather than entry-level option.

=== Critical reception ===
Professional reviews have been generally positive, with praise for the camera's image quality, build improvements, and return to enthusiast-friendly controls. Amateur Photographer described it as "a lovely little camera that goes a long way to meeting the promise of an 'interchangeable lens X100VI'" and "a joy to shoot with."

PetaPixel noted that while the X-E cameras were "largely designed to be a beginner's gateway into the Fujifilm system," the X-E5 "changes all that" with its premium features and build quality. However, the same review criticized the lack of weather sealing and the dated viewfinder specifications.

Digital Camera World praised the implementation of the film simulation dial, calling it "by far the best implementation yet" of this feature across Fujifilm's lineup. The review also highlighted the camera's appeal for street, travel, and social photography.

Common criticisms across reviews included:

- Lack of weather sealing despite the premium price point
- Small, low-resolution viewfinder unchanged from earlier models
- Limited battery life compared to the X-E4 (310 shots vs 460 shots per CIPA rating)
- Overheating issues during extended video recording

== Companion lens ==
Alongside the X-E5, Fujifilm announced the XF 23mm f/2.8 R WR pancake lens, marketed as the company's lightest X-mount lens at 90 grams. Multiple reviewers noted that this lens creates a particularly compact combination ideal for travel and street photography.

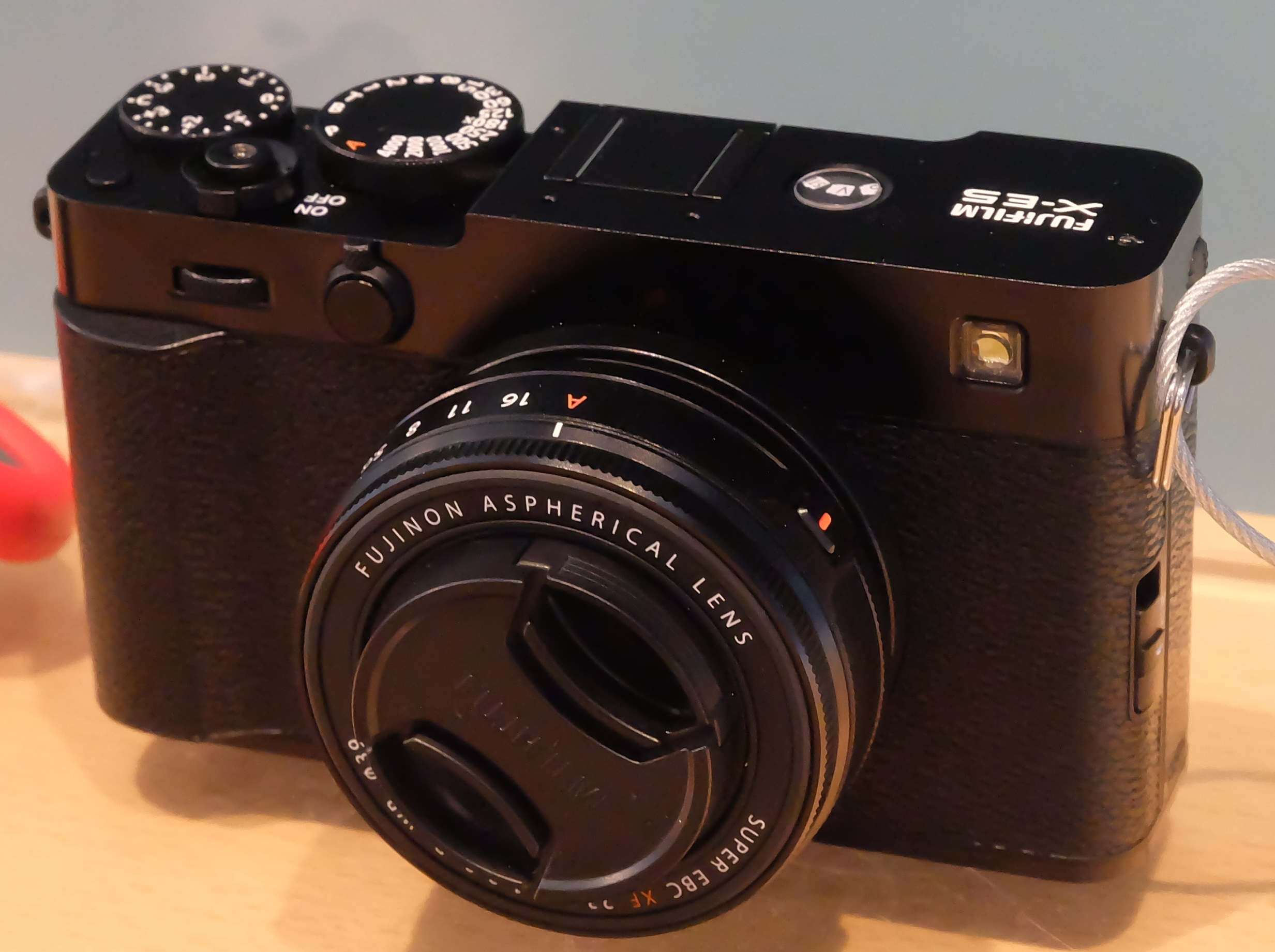

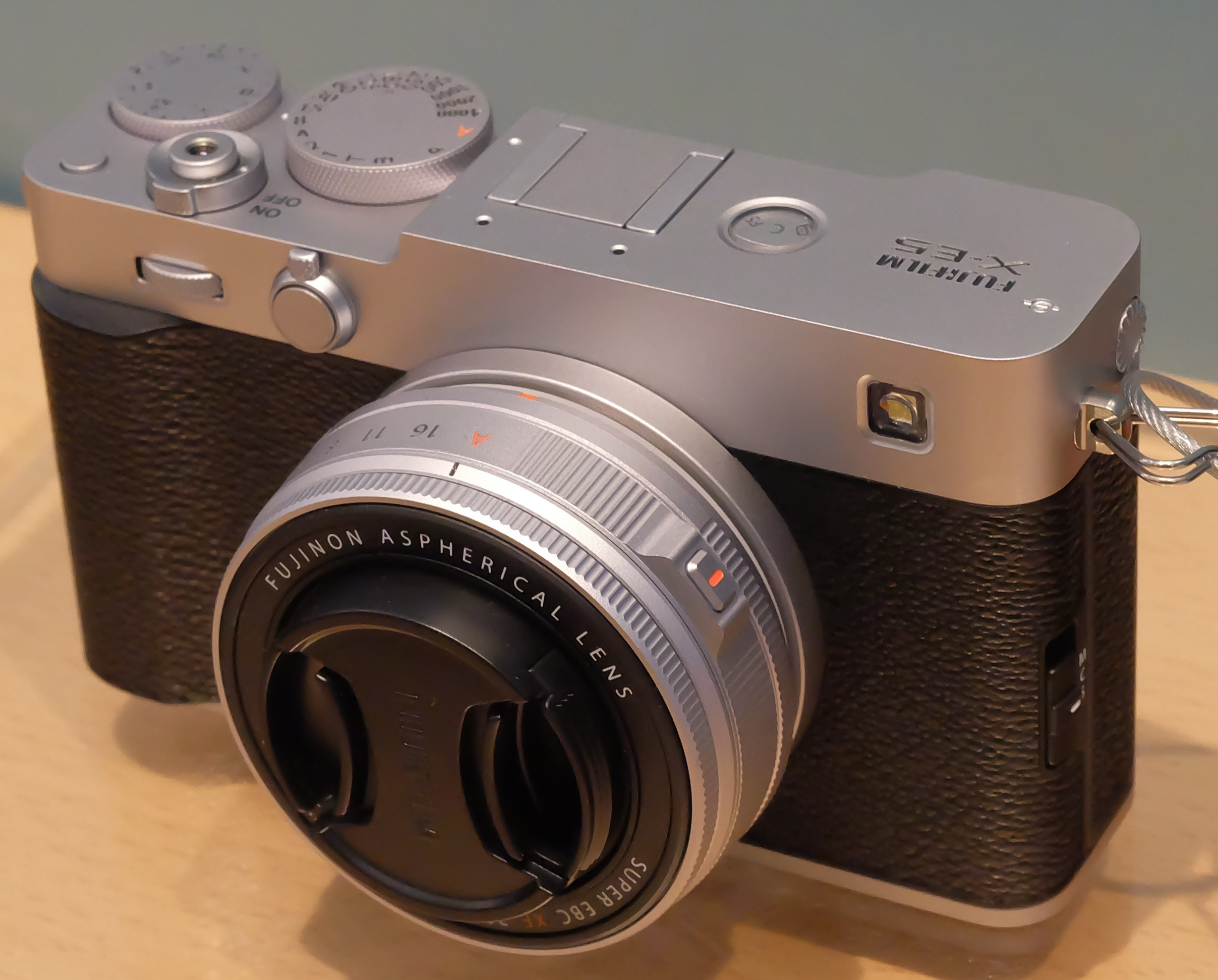

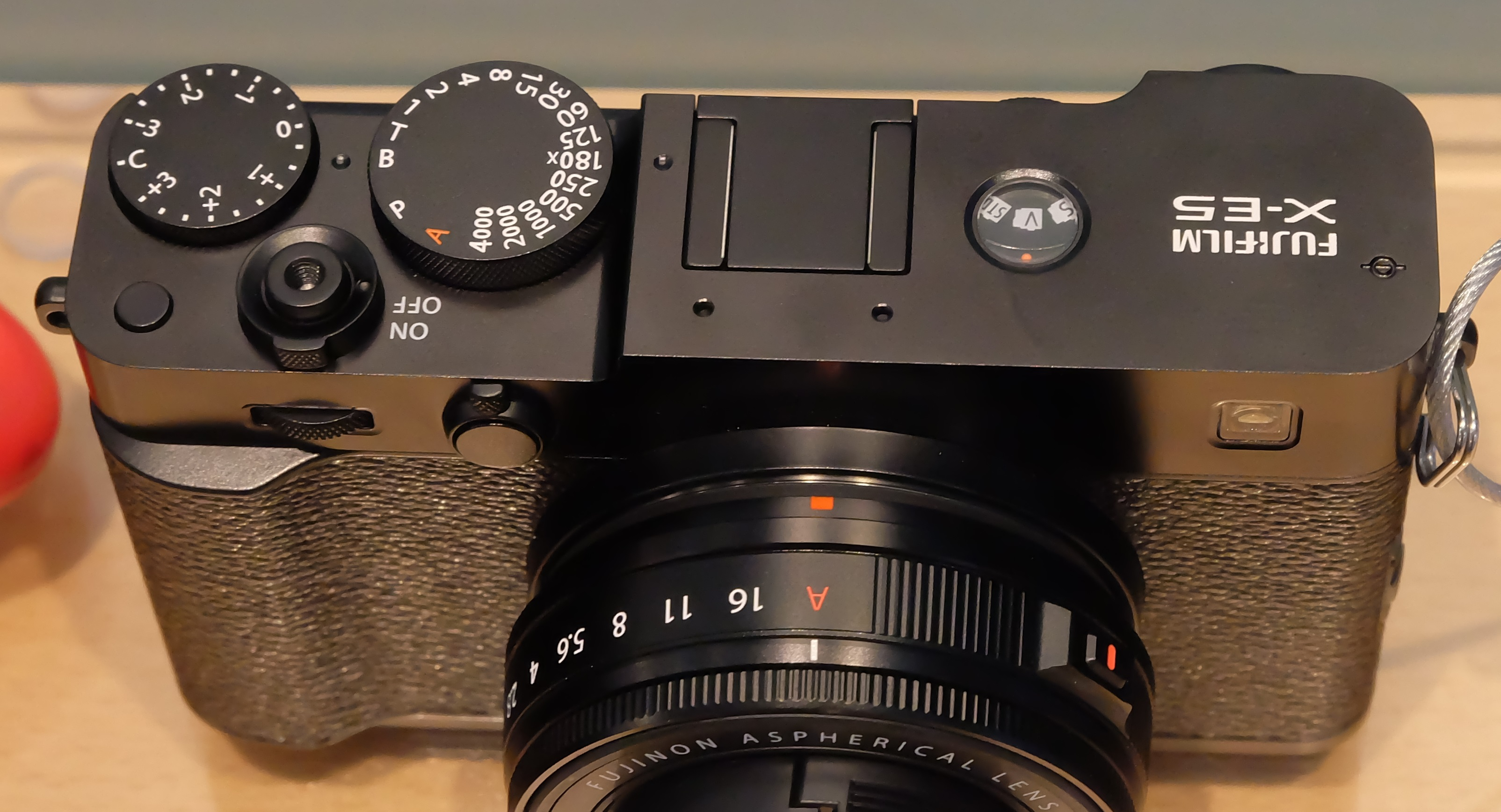

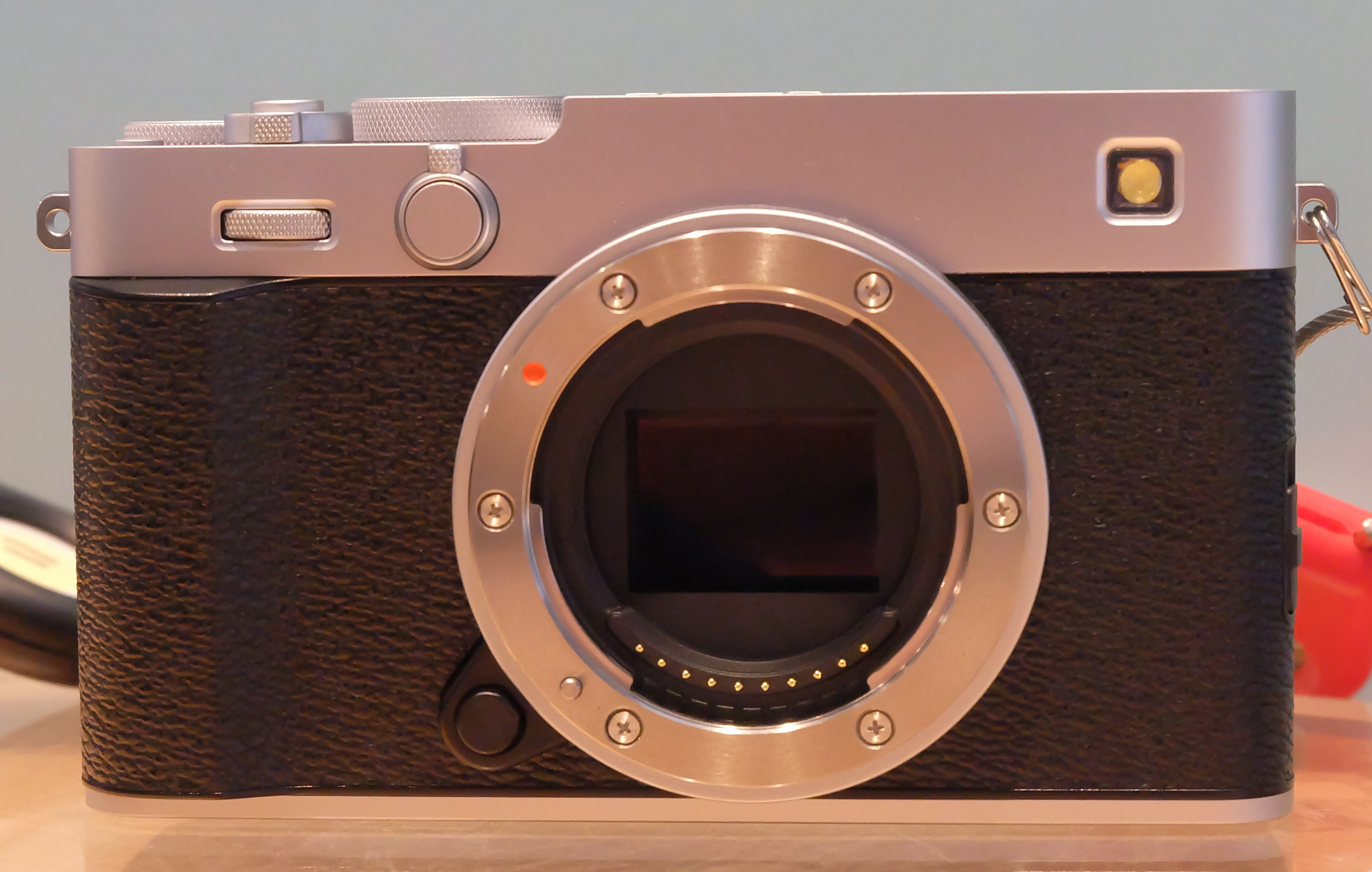

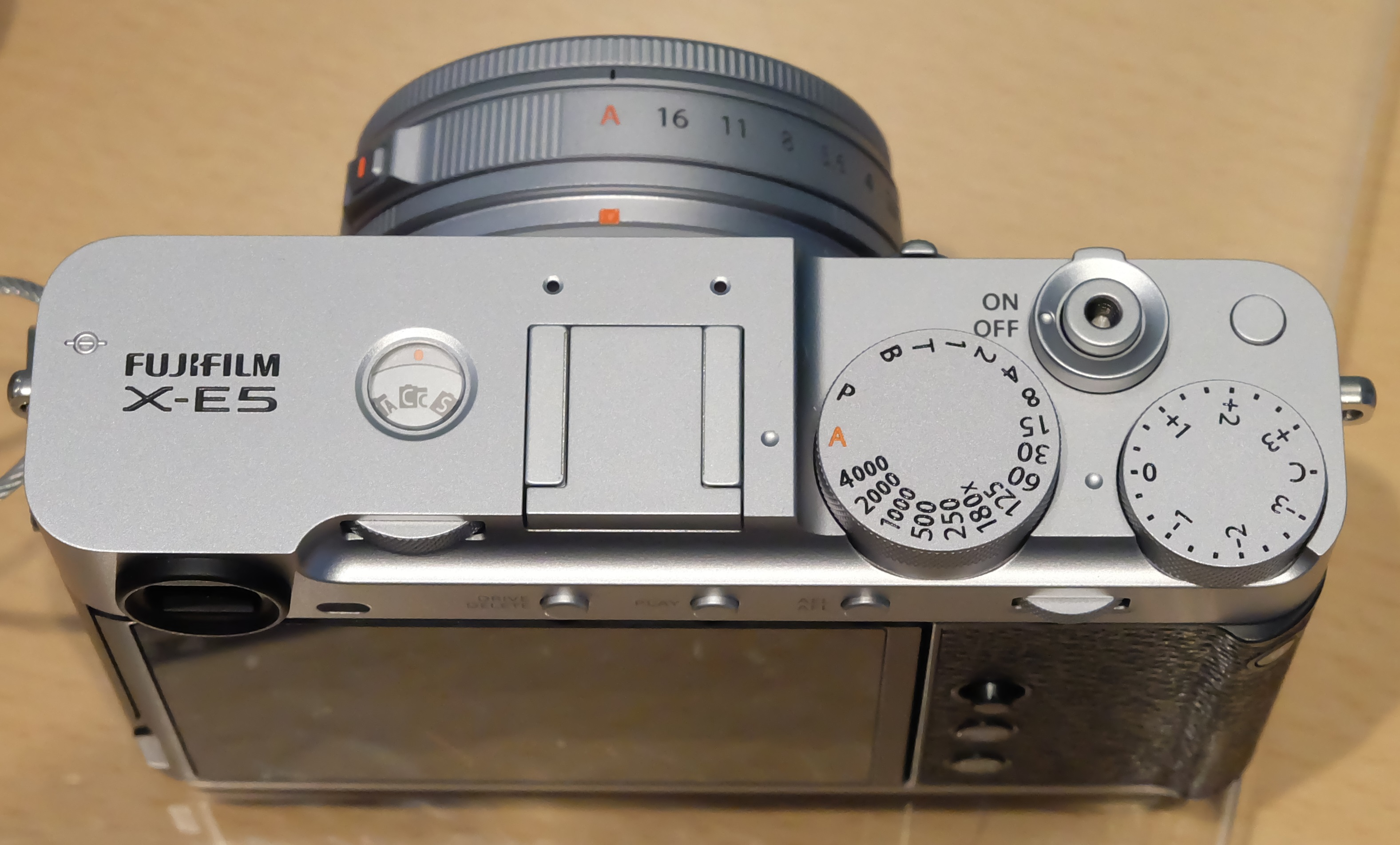

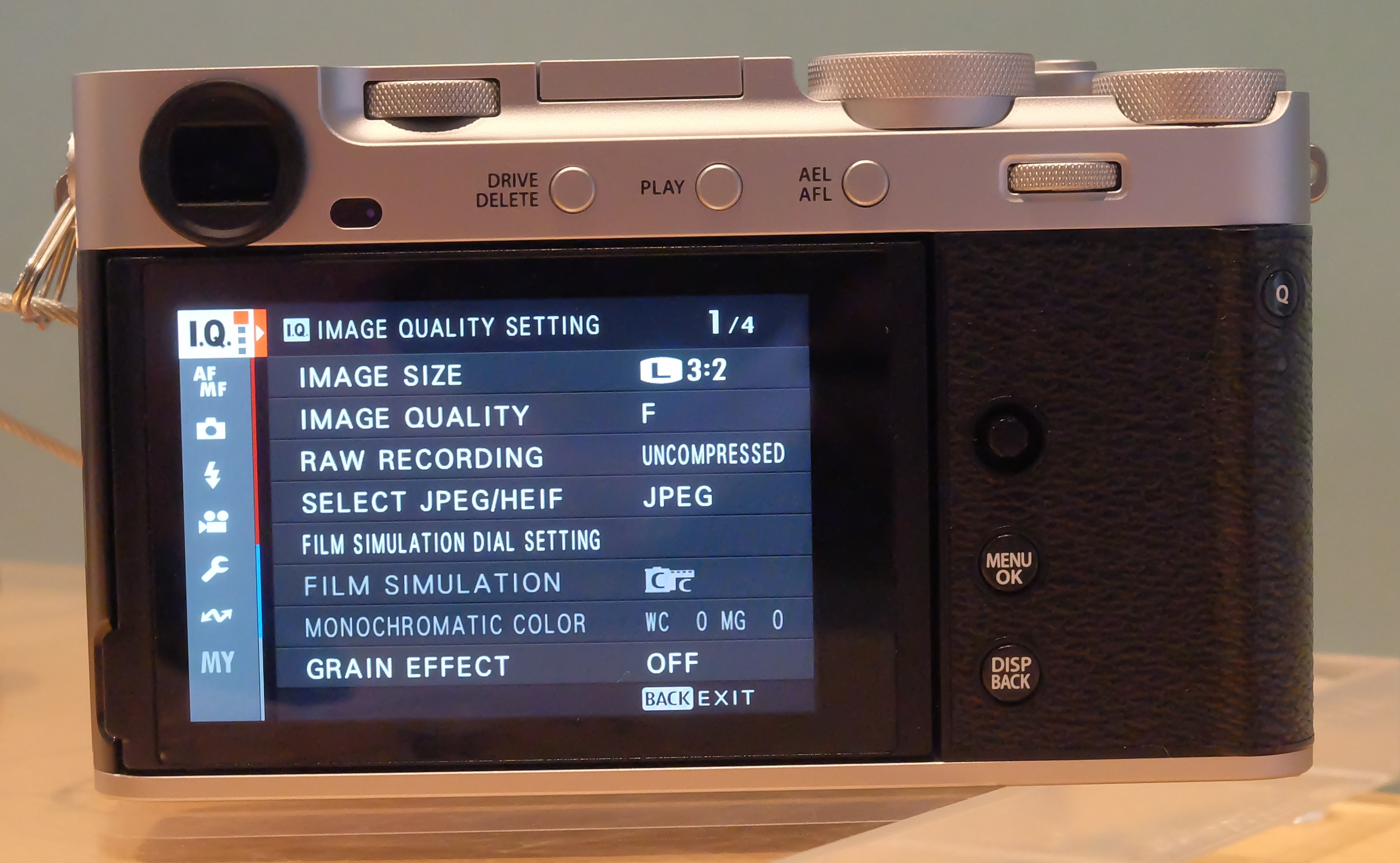

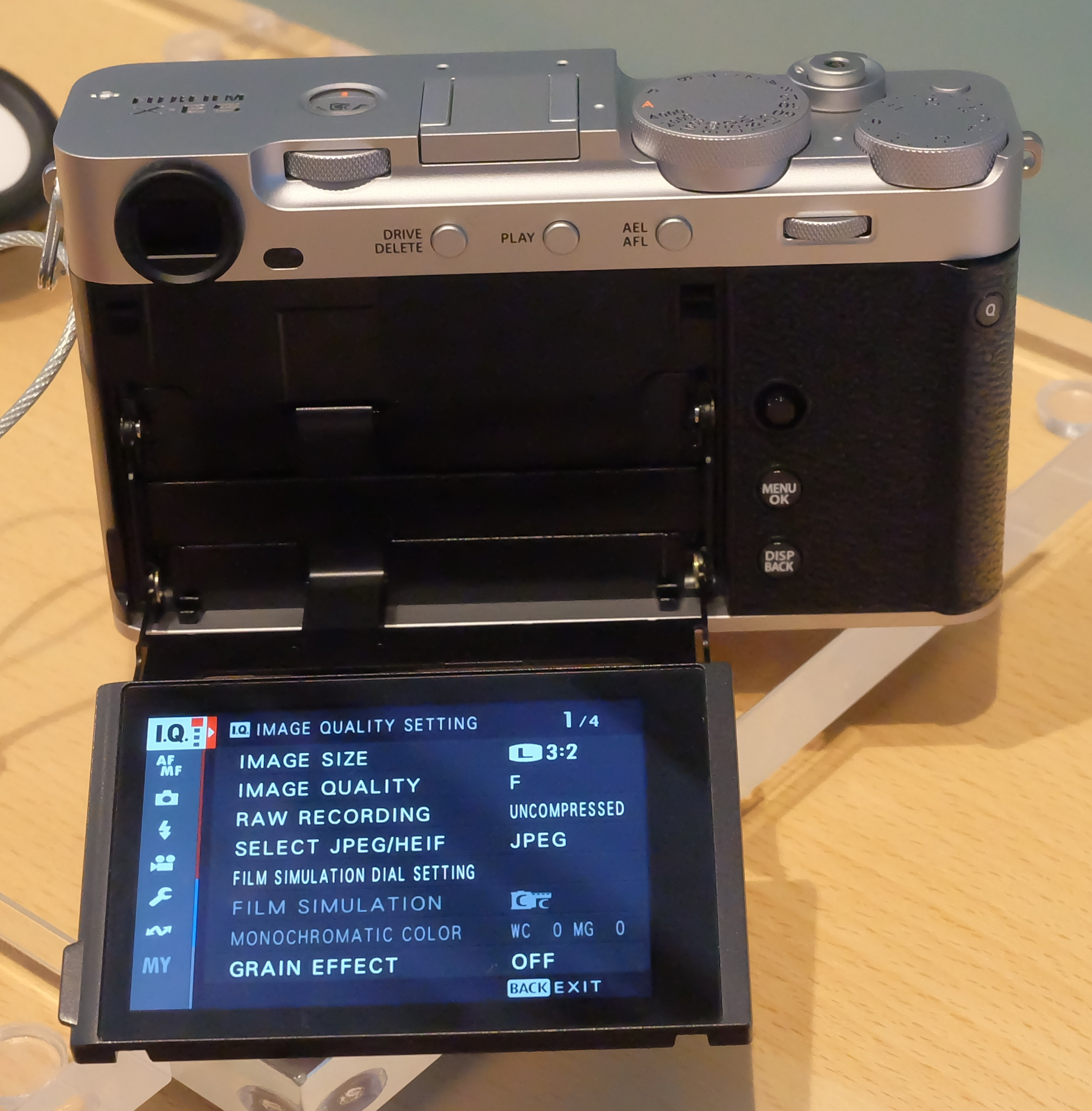

== See also ==
- Fujifilm X series
- Fujifilm X100VI
- Fujifilm X-T50
- List of Fujifilm X-mount cameras
- Mirrorless camera

Type	Lens	2011	2012	2013	2014	2015	2016	2017	2018	2019	2020	2021	2022	2023	2024	2025	2026
MILC	G-mount; Medium format sensor							GFX 50S ^{F} ^{T}					GFX 50S II ^{F} ^{T}				
MILC	G-mount; Medium format sensor									GFX 50R ^{F} ^{T}							
MILC	G-mount; Medium format sensor										GFX 100 ^{F} ^{T}					GFX 100 II ^{F} ^{T}	
MILC	G-mount; Medium format sensor											GFX 100 IR ^{F} ^{T}					
MILC	G-mount; Medium format sensor											GFX 100S ^{F} ^{T}				GFX 100S II ^{F} ^{T}	
MILC	G-mount; Medium format sensor															GFX Eterna 55 ^{F} ^{T}	
MILC	Prime lens Medium format sensor															GFX 100RF ^{F} ^{T}	
MILC	X-mount; APS-C sensor		X-Pro1				X-Pro2				X-Pro3 ^{f} ^{T}						
MILC	X-mount; APS-C sensor								X-H1 ^{F} ^{T}					X-H2 ^{A} ^{T}			
MILC	X-mount; APS-C sensor													X-H2S ^{A} ^{T}			
MILC	X-mount; APS-C sensor											X-S10 ^{A} ^{T}			X-S20 ^{A} ^{T}		
MILC	X-mount; APS-C sensor				X-T1 ^{f}			X-T2 ^{F}		X-T3 ^{F} ^{T}		X-T4 ^{A} ^{T}		X-T5 ^{F} ^{T}			
MILC	X-mount; APS-C sensor															X-T50 ^{f} ^{T}	
MILC	X-mount; APS-C sensor						X-T10 ^{f}	X-T20 ^{f} ^{T}		X-T30 ^{f} ^{T}			X-T30 II ^{f} ^{T}			X-T30 III ^{f} ^{T}	
MILC	X-mount; APS-C sensor									_{15} X-T100 ^{F} ^{T}	X-T200 ^{A} ^{T}						
MILC	X-mount; APS-C sensor			X-E1	X-E2		X-E2s		X-E3 ^{T}			X-E4 ^{f} ^{T}				X-E5 ^{f} ^{T}	
MILC	X-mount; APS-C sensor				X-M1 ^{f}											X-M5 ^{A} ^{T}	
MILC	X-mount; APS-C sensor				X-A1 ^{f}	X-A2 ^{f}		X-A3 ^{f} ^{T}	_{15} X-A5 ^{f} ^{T}		X-A7 ^{A} ^{T}						
MILC	X-mount; APS-C sensor							X-A10 ^{f}	X-A20 ^{f} ^{T}								
Compact	Prime lens APS-C sensor	X100		X100S		X100T		X100F			X100V ^{f} ^{T}				X100VI ^{f} ^{T}		
Compact	Prime lens APS-C sensor						X70 ^{f} ^{T}			XF10 ^{T}							
Compact	Prime lens 1" sensor															X half ^{T}	
Compact	Zoom lens^{2}/_{3}" sensor		X10	X20		X30 ^{f}											
Compact	Zoom lens^{2}/_{3}" sensor				XQ1	XQ2											
Compact	Zoom lens^{2}/_{3}" sensor			XF1													
Bridge	^{2}/_{3}" sensor		X-S1 ^{f}														
Type	Lens																
Type	Lens	2011	2012	2013	2014	2015	2016	2017	2018	2019	2020	2021	2022	2023	2024	2025	2026
