= Fujifilm X-E3 =

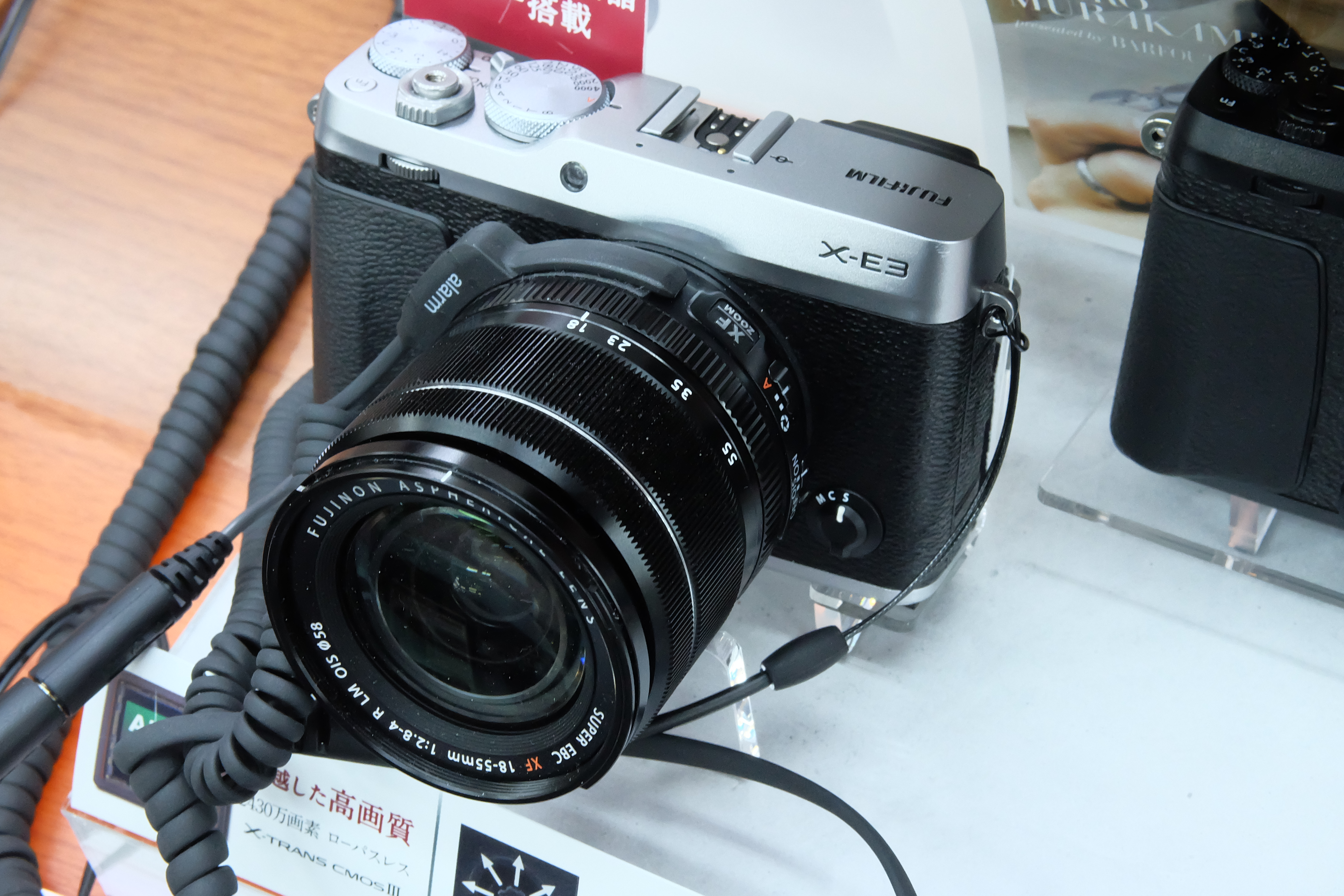

Overview
- Maker: Fujifilm
- Type: MILC

Lens
- Lens mount: Fujifilm X
- Lens: Interchangeable lens

Sensor/medium
- Sensor type: X-Trans CMOS III
- Sensor size: 23.6 mm × 15.6 mm (APS-C)
- Sensor maker: Sony
- Maximum resolution: 6016 x 4016 (24.3 megapixels)
- Film speed: 200–12800 (standard); 100–51200 (extend)
- Recording medium: SD, SDHC, SDXC (UHS-I)
- Storage media: SD Card (UHS-I)

Focusing
- Focus: Intelligent Hybrid TTL contrast detection / Phase detection
- Focus modes: Single point, Zone, Wide/Tracking
- Focus areas: 91 focus point

Exposure/metering
- Exposure: TTL 256-zone metering
- Exposure bracketing: AE Bracketing
- Exposure modes: Program, Aperture Priority, Shutter Speed Priority, Manual Exposure
- Metering modes: Multi, Spot, Average, Center Weighted

Flash
- Compatible flashes: Shoe Mount Flash

Shutter
- Shutter: Focal Plane Shutter
- Shutter speeds: 4 s to 1/4000 s (mechanical), 4 s to 1/32000 s (electronic)

Viewfinder
- Viewfinder: EVF with eye sensor

Image processing
- Image processor: X-Processor 3

General
- Video recording: 4K up to 30 fps, 1080p up to 60 fps
- Battery: NP-W126S Li-ion
- Dimensions: 121.3×73.9×42.7 mm (4.78×2.91×1.68 in)
- Weight: 337 g (12 oz) including battery and memory card

Chronology
- Predecessor: Fujifilm X-E2, Fujifilm X-E2s
- Successor: Fujifilm X-E4

The Fujifilm X-E3 is a digital rangefinder-style mirrorless camera announced by Fujifilm on September 7, 2017. It is part of the company's X-series range of cameras.

== Design ==
The design of the Fujifilm X-E3 is based on that of its predecessor models X-E2 and X-E2s, only that the case is about eight millimeters narrower and partly designed slightly differently. Both the X-E2s and the X-T20 have some differences in the operating concept, especially on the rear of the case. With 337 grams of operational weight (without lens), the X-E3 is also slightly lighter than its predecessor and significantly lighter than the X-T20.

== See also ==
- List of retro-style digital cameras

Type	Lens	2011	2012	2013	2014	2015	2016	2017	2018	2019	2020	2021	2022	2023	2024	2025
MILC	G-mount; Medium format sensor							GFX 50S ^{F} ^{T}					GFX 50S II ^{F} ^{T}			
MILC	G-mount; Medium format sensor									GFX 50R ^{F} ^{T}						
MILC	G-mount; Medium format sensor										GFX 100 ^{F} ^{T}					GFX 100 II ^{F} ^{T}
MILC	G-mount; Medium format sensor											GFX 100 IR ^{F} ^{T}				
MILC	G-mount; Medium format sensor											GFX 100S ^{F} ^{T}				GFX 100S II^{F} ^{T}
MILC	G-mount; Medium format sensor															GFX Eterna 55^{F} ^{T}
MILC	Prime lens Medium format sensor															GFX 100RF ^{F} ^{T}
MILC	X-mount; APS-C sensor		X-Pro1				X-Pro2				X-Pro3 ^{f} ^{T}					
MILC	X-mount; APS-C sensor								X-H1 ^{F} ^{T}					X-H2 ^{A} ^{T}		
MILC	X-mount; APS-C sensor													X-H2S ^{A} ^{T}		
MILC	X-mount; APS-C sensor											X-S10 ^{A} ^{T}			X-S20 ^{A} ^{T}	
MILC	X-mount; APS-C sensor				X-T1 ^{f}			X-T2 ^{F}		X-T3 ^{F} ^{T}		X-T4 ^{A} ^{T}		X-T5 ^{F} ^{T}		
MILC	X-mount; APS-C sensor						X-T10 ^{f}	X-T20 ^{f} ^{T}		X-T30 ^{f} ^{T}			X-T30 II ^{f} ^{T}			X-T50 ^{f} ^{T}
MILC	X-mount; APS-C sensor									_{15} X-T100 ^{F} ^{T}	X-T200 ^{A} ^{T}					
MILC	X-mount; APS-C sensor			X-E1	X-E2		X-E2s		X-E3 ^{T}			X-E4 ^{f} ^{T}				X-E5 ^{f} ^{T}
MILC	X-mount; APS-C sensor				X-M1 ^{f}											X-M5 ^{A} ^{T}
MILC	X-mount; APS-C sensor				X-A1 ^{f}	X-A2 ^{f}		X-A3 ^{f} ^{T}	_{15} X-A5 ^{f} ^{T}		X-A7 ^{A} ^{T}					
MILC	X-mount; APS-C sensor							X-A10 ^{f}	X-A20 ^{f} ^{T}							
Compact	Prime lens APS-C sensor	X100		X100S		X100T		X100F			X100V ^{f} ^{T}				X100VI ^{f} ^{T}	
Compact	Prime lens APS-C sensor						X70 ^{f} ^{T}			XF10 ^{T}						
Compact	Prime lens 1" sensor															X half ^{T}
Compact	Zoom lens^{2}/_{3}" sensor		X10	X20		X30 ^{f}										
Compact	Zoom lens^{2}/_{3}" sensor				XQ1	XQ2										
Compact	Zoom lens^{2}/_{3}" sensor			XF1												
Bridge	^{2}/_{3}" sensor		X-S1 ^{f}													
Type	Lens															
Type	Lens	2011	2012	2013	2014	2015	2016	2017	2018	2019	2020	2021	2022	2023	2024	2025
