= Fujifilm X-E2 =

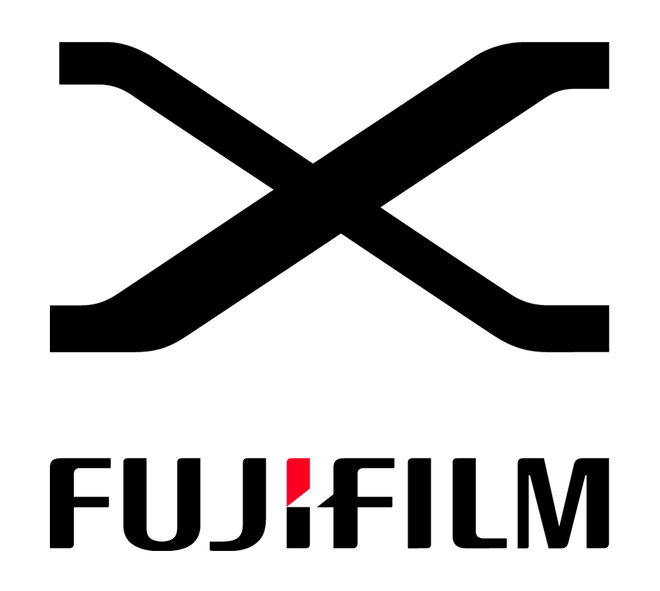
- X-E2

Overview
- Maker: Fujifilm
- Type: MILC
- Released: X-E2: 18 October 2013; 12 years ago X-E2s: 15 February 2016; 10 years ago
- Intro price: X-E2: USD 999 (body), USD 1,399 (kit); X-E2s: USD 699 (body), USD 999 (kit)

Lens
- Lens mount: Fujifilm X
- Lens: Interchangeable lens
- Compatible lenses: Fujinon

Sensor/medium
- Sensor: APS-C
- Sensor type: X-Trans CMOS II
- Sensor size: 23.6 mm × 15.6 mm
- Sensor maker: Sony
- Maximum resolution: 16.3 megapixels 4896 x 3264
- Film speed: 160–6400 (standard); 80–25600 (X-E2, extend); 80–51200 (X-E2S, extend)
- Storage media: SD, SDHC, SDXC, UHS-I

Focusing
- Focus: Intelligent Hybrid TTL AF contrast and phase detection
- Focus modes: Single AF, Continuous AF, Manual
- Focus areas: 91 focus point
- Focus bracketing: Auto, Manual

Exposure/metering
- Exposure: TTL 256-zone metering
- Exposure bracketing: -3.0EV - +3.0EV, 1/3EV step
- Exposure modes: Program AE, Aperture Priority AE, Shutter Speed Priority AE, Manual Exposure
- Exposure metering: Through-the-lens
- Metering modes: Multi, Spot, Average, Center Weighted

Flash
- Flash: Manual pop-up flash
- Flash synchronization: 1/180 s
- Compatible flashes: Shoe Mount Flash

Shutter
- Shutter: Focal Plane Shutter
- Shutter speeds: X-E2: 1/4 s to 1/4000 s X-E2s: 1 s to 1/32000 s
- Continuous shooting: 7.0 fps

Viewfinder
- Viewfinder: EVF with eye sensor
- Electronic viewfinder: 0.5" 2.360K dots OLED Viewfinder
- Viewfinder magnification: 0.62
- Frame coverage: 100%

Image processing
- Image processor: EXR Processor II
- White balance: Auto, Custom, Preset, Fluorescent, Incandescent, Underwater
- WB bracketing: ±1, ±2, ±3
- Dynamic range bracketing: 100%, 200%, 400%

General
- Video recording: MOV; 1080p up to 60 fps, 720p up to 60 fps
- LCD screen: 3.0" 1.04M dots
- Battery: NP-W126 Li-ion
- AV port(s): HDMI C, ⌀2.5 mm audio jack
- Data port: USB 2.0, Wi-Fi 4
- Body features: Magnesium alloy body
- Dimensions: X-E2: 129 mm × 74.9 mm × 37.2 mm (5.08 in × 2.95 in × 1.46 in); X-E2s: 129 mm × 74.9 mm × 37.2 mm (5.08 in × 2.95 in × 1.46 in)
- Weight: X-E2: 350 g (0.77 lb); X-E2s: 350 g (0.77 lb) including battery and memory card
- Made in: Japan

Chronology
- Predecessor: Fujifilm X-E1
- Successor: Fujifilm X-E3

The Fujifilm X-E2 is a digital rangefinder-style mirrorless camera announced by Fujifilm on October 18, 2013. An updated version with minor improvements of the camera, called the Fujifilm X-E2s, was announced on January 15, 2016. Both cameras are part of the company's X-series range of cameras.

== Fujifilm X-E2 ==
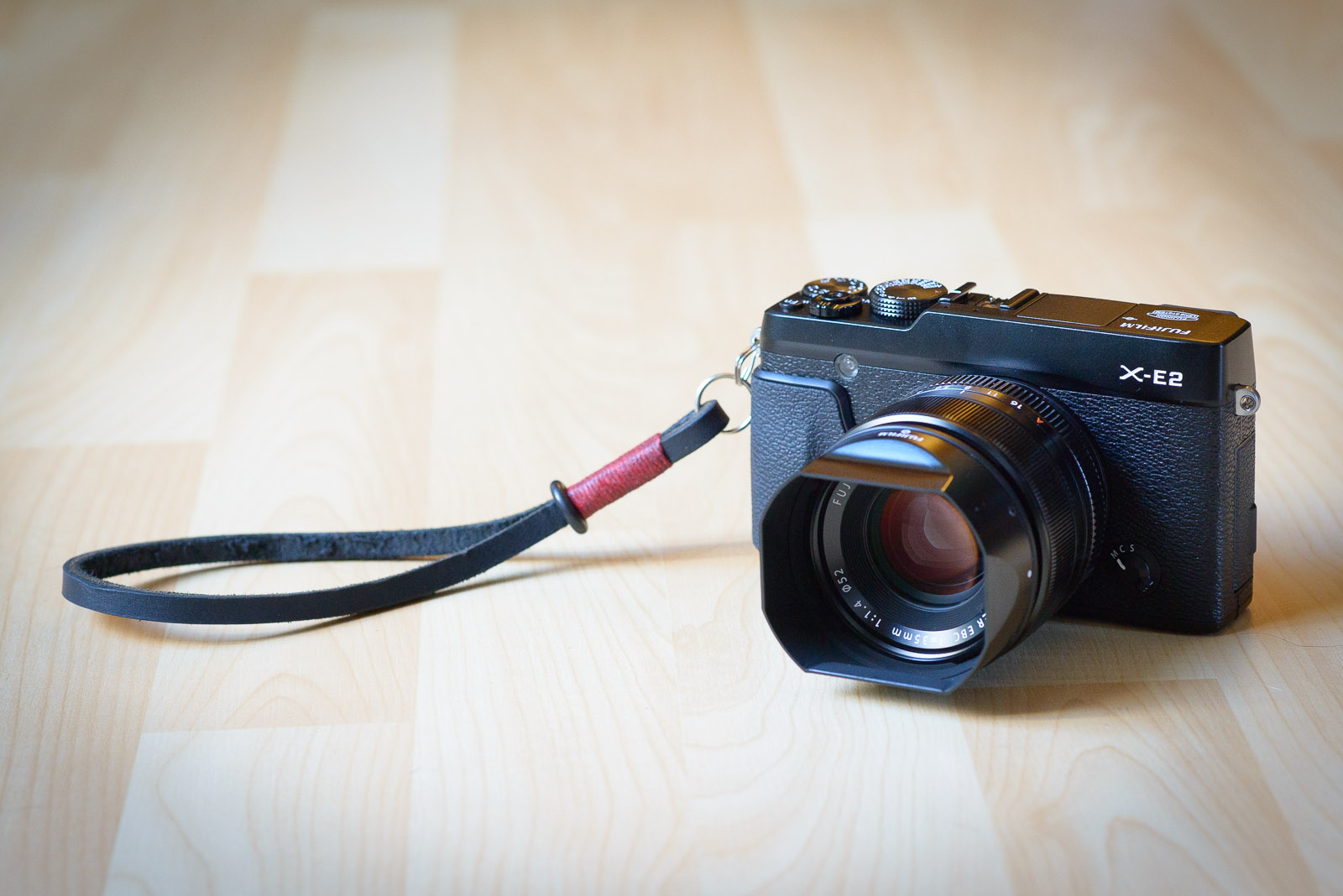

The Fujifilm X-E2 is mid-range retro-style mirrorless interchangeable lens camera. The camera has the same 16MP resolution as its predecessor but a new sensor, the X-Trans CMOS II sensor. It also gets a Wi-Fi support and a new image processor, the EXR Processor II doubling the processing speed.

X-E2 is very similar to its predecessor, the X-E1, having the same body design and control layout.

=== Key features ===
- 16MP APS-C X-Trans CMOS II sensor
- EXR Processor II
- ISO 200-6400, expandable up to 25600 (X-E2) or 51200 (X-E2S)
- 7 fps continuous shooting; 3 fps with continuous AF
- Lens Modulation Optimizer
- 2.36M dot OLED electronic viewfinder
- 3" 1.04M dot fixed-type LCD monitor
- Wi-Fi 4 for image transfer to smartphones or computers
- 1080p 60p movie recording with built-in stereo microphone
- 2.5mm stereo microphone socket
- Available in silver or black

== Fujifilm X-E2s ==
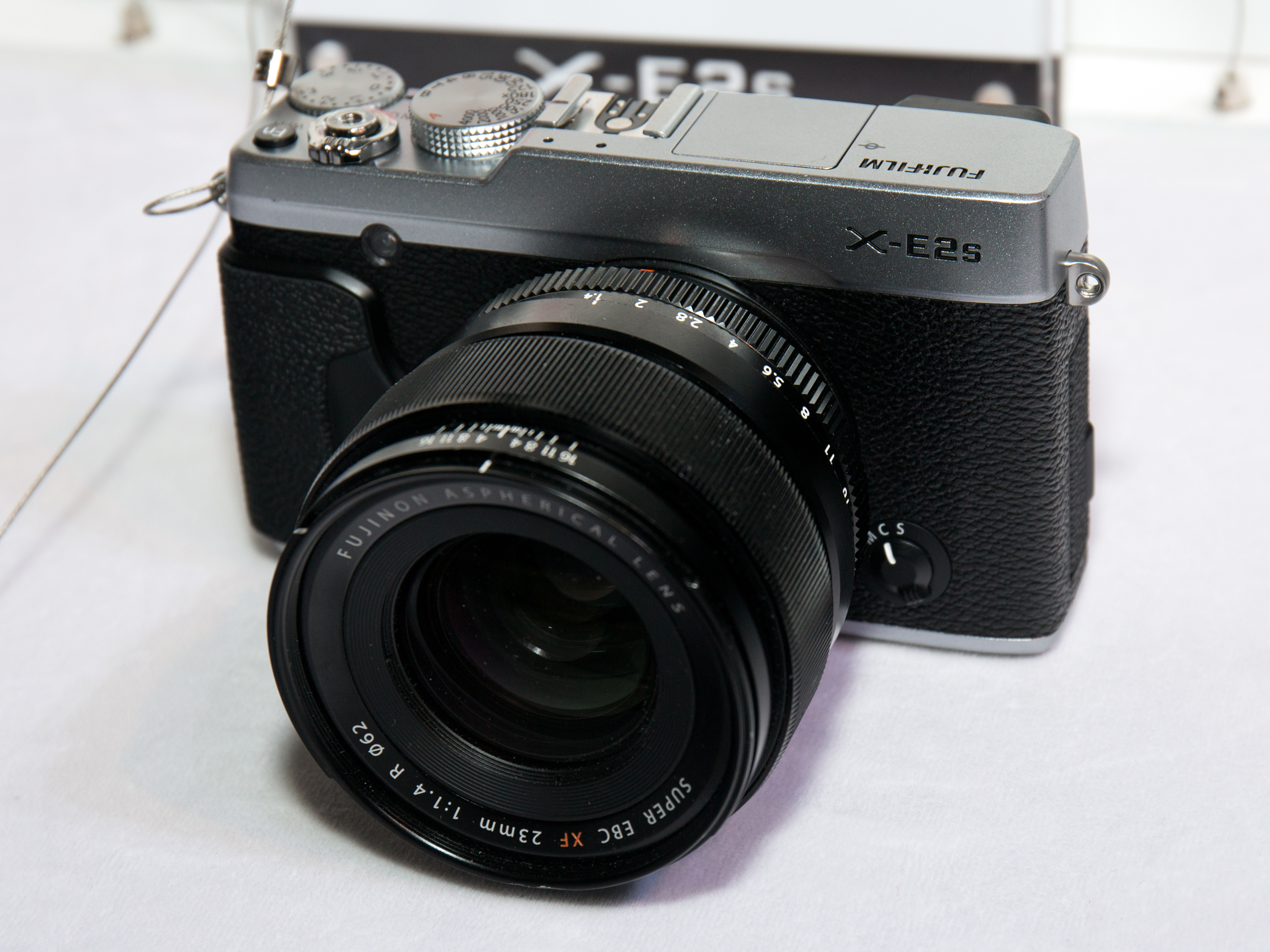

The Fujifilm X-E2S is a mid-range rangefinder-styled interchangeable lens mirrorless camera with a 16MP camera and X-Trans CMOS II sensor.

The X-E2s is almost identical to its predecessor, the X-E2 camera. Aside from the new firmware, also available for its predecessor, changes include an electronic shutter option, extended ISO to 51200, auto mode, motion detection for slow shutter speeds and an optimised grip along with other minor cosmetic changes. The price at release date is $300 cheaper than the X-E2's.

=== Key Features ===
- 16MP APS-C X-Trans CMOS II sensor
- EXR Processor II
- An 'Auto' button on the rear.
- Maximum ISO boost comes in at 51200
- Tweaked grip, top plate loses the 'Fujinon Lens System' engraving
- Rear four-way controller now defaults to AF point selection
- 77-point autofocus system
- 1080p 60p video capture
- 3" 1.04M dot fixed-type LCD monitor
- 2.36M dot OLED electronic viewfinder
- 7 fps continuous shooting
- Wi-Fi 4

== See also ==
- List of retro-style digital cameras

Type	Lens	2011	2012	2013	2014	2015	2016	2017	2018	2019	2020	2021	2022	2023	2024	2025
MILC	G-mount; Medium format sensor							GFX 50S ^{F} ^{T}					GFX 50S II ^{F} ^{T}			
MILC	G-mount; Medium format sensor									GFX 50R ^{F} ^{T}						
MILC	G-mount; Medium format sensor										GFX 100 ^{F} ^{T}					GFX 100 II ^{F} ^{T}
MILC	G-mount; Medium format sensor											GFX 100 IR ^{F} ^{T}				
MILC	G-mount; Medium format sensor											GFX 100S ^{F} ^{T}				GFX 100S II^{F} ^{T}
MILC	G-mount; Medium format sensor															GFX Eterna 55^{F} ^{T}
MILC	Prime lens Medium format sensor															GFX 100RF ^{F} ^{T}
MILC	X-mount; APS-C sensor		X-Pro1				X-Pro2				X-Pro3 ^{f} ^{T}					
MILC	X-mount; APS-C sensor								X-H1 ^{F} ^{T}					X-H2 ^{A} ^{T}		
MILC	X-mount; APS-C sensor													X-H2S ^{A} ^{T}		
MILC	X-mount; APS-C sensor											X-S10 ^{A} ^{T}			X-S20 ^{A} ^{T}	
MILC	X-mount; APS-C sensor				X-T1 ^{f}			X-T2 ^{F}		X-T3 ^{F} ^{T}		X-T4 ^{A} ^{T}		X-T5 ^{F} ^{T}		
MILC	X-mount; APS-C sensor						X-T10 ^{f}	X-T20 ^{f} ^{T}		X-T30 ^{f} ^{T}			X-T30 II ^{f} ^{T}			X-T50 ^{f} ^{T}
MILC	X-mount; APS-C sensor									_{15} X-T100 ^{F} ^{T}	X-T200 ^{A} ^{T}					X-T30 III ^{f} ^{T}
MILC	X-mount; APS-C sensor			X-E1	X-E2		X-E2s		X-E3 ^{T}			X-E4 ^{f} ^{T}				X-E5 ^{f} ^{T}
MILC	X-mount; APS-C sensor				X-M1 ^{f}											X-M5 ^{A} ^{T}
MILC	X-mount; APS-C sensor				X-A1 ^{f}	X-A2 ^{f}		X-A3 ^{f} ^{T}	_{15} X-A5 ^{f} ^{T}		X-A7 ^{A} ^{T}					
MILC	X-mount; APS-C sensor							X-A10 ^{f}	X-A20 ^{f} ^{T}							
Compact	Prime lens APS-C sensor	X100		X100S		X100T		X100F			X100V ^{f} ^{T}				X100VI ^{f} ^{T}	
Compact	Prime lens APS-C sensor						X70 ^{f} ^{T}			XF10 ^{T}						
Compact	Prime lens 1" sensor															X half ^{T}
Compact	Zoom lens^{2}/_{3}" sensor		X10	X20		X30 ^{f}										
Compact	Zoom lens^{2}/_{3}" sensor				XQ1	XQ2										
Compact	Zoom lens^{2}/_{3}" sensor			XF1												
Bridge	^{2}/_{3}" sensor		X-S1 ^{f}													
Type	Lens															
Type	Lens	2011	2012	2013	2014	2015	2016	2017	2018	2019	2020	2021	2022	2023	2024	2025
