= Fujifilm GFX100S II =

Camera model

Overview
- Maker: Fujifilm
- Type: Mirrorless Camera
- Released: May 16, 2024; 2 years ago
- Intro price: USD 4,999(body)

Lens
- Lens mount: Fujifilm G
- Lens: Interchangeable lens

Sensor/medium
- Sensor type: CMOS with Bayer filter
- Sensor size: 43.8 mm x 32.9 mm (Medium format)
- Sensor maker: Sony
- Maximum resolution: 11648 × 8736 (102 megapixels)
- Film speed: ISO 80–12800 (standard); ISO 40–102400 (extended)
- Storage media: SD card (SD, SDHC, SDXC), UHS-I and UHS-II, V90; SSD

Focusing
- Focus: Intelligent Hybrid TTL contrast detection / Phase detection
- Focus modes: Single point, Zone, Wide/Tracking; Face/eye detection; Subject detection: Animal, Bird / Insect, Automobile, Motorcycle, Bike, Airplane / Drone, Train;
- Focus areas: 117 focus points (13×9 grid): all modes; 425 (25×17 grid): only for manual focus mode or AF mode with single point
- Focus bracketing: Manual: 0-10 s interval, 1–10 step size, 1–999 frames; Auto: set near and distant focus points

Exposure/metering
- Exposure bracketing: 2 / 3 / 5 / 7 / 9 frames; min. bracket step 1/3 EV, max. 3 EV
- Exposure modes: Program, Aperture Priority, Shutter Speed Priority, Manual Exposure
- Exposure metering: TTL 256-zones metering
- Metering modes: Multi, Spot, Average, center weighted

Flash
- Flash: External flash: attached to hot shoe or (by cord) to sync contact
- Flash exposure compensation: TTL: ±5 EV; Manual: 1/512 to 1/1 in 1/3 EV steps (only available when an optional shoe-mounted compatible flash / remote unit is attached and activated)
- Flash synchronization: 1/125 s (both hot shoe and sync contact)
- Flash bracketing: ±1/3 EV / ±2/3 EV / ±1 EV
- Compatible flashes: Fujifilm TTL flash / remote units and compatible

Shutter
- Frame rate: 7.0 fps (mechanical); 2.9 fps (electronic)
- Shutter: Focal Plane Shutter / electronic shutter
- Shutter speed range: 60 min to 1/16000 s (depends on selected mode)
- Shutter speeds: 30 s / 60 min (modes P, A / S, M) to 1/4000 s (mechanical), 30 s / 60 min (modes P, A / S, M) to 1/16000 s (electronic), Bulb mode max. 60 min
- Continuous shooting: JPEG (mechanical and electronic): 1000+ frames continuously; Uncompressed Raw+JPEG (mechanical, 7.0 fps): 55 frames, (electronic, 2.9 fps): 98 frames; complete specifications see.

Viewfinder
- Viewfinder: 0.6 inches 5.76M dots OLED, 120 Hz refresh rate
- Viewfinder magnification: 0.84
- Frame coverage: 100%

Image processing
- Image processor: X-Processor 5
- White balance: Auto: White Priority, Auto, Ambience Priority; Custom: 1, 2, 3; ColourTemp: 2500K to 10000K; Presets: Daylight, Shade, Fluorescent Light: 1, 2, 3, Incandescent Light, Underwater
- WB bracketing: ±1 / ±2 / ±3
- Dynamic range bracketing: 100% / 200% / 400%

General
- Video recording: MP4 / MOV; 4K full frame: up to 30 fps; 2K / 1080p: up to 60 fps
- LCD screen: 3.2-inch 2.36M dots tilt-type (3-direction) colour LCD touch screen
- Battery: NP-W235 Li-ion (1x)
- AV port(s): 3.5 mm Microphone / remote release, 3.5 mm Headphone, HDMI type A
- Data port(s): USB-C 3.2 Gen2x1, LAN Terminal 1000/100/10, Wi-Fi 5 (a/b/g/n/ac), Bluetooth 4.2
- Body features: In-Body Image Stabilization, Pixel-Shift, Ultra Sonic Vibration Sensor Cleaning system
- Dimensions: 150.0 mm × 104.2 mm × 87.2 mm (5.91 in × 4.10 in × 3.43 in) (with EVF)
- Weight: 883 g (31 oz) (1.947 lb) including battery and SD memory card
- Made in: Japan

Chronology
- Predecessor: Fujifilm GFX100S; some elements derived from Fujifilm GFX100
- Successor: not announced

Footnotes
- Extended features: File format specifications: JPEG (Exif Ver. 2.32); TIFF (8bit / 16bit RGB); HEIF (4:2:2 10bit); Raw (.RAF extension); Self-timer: Still pictures: Off, 2s, 10s; Movies: Off, 3s, 5s, 10s; Interval timer shooting: interval, no. shots, starting time, exposure smoothing, interval priority mode; Additional bracketing mode: ISO bracketing (±1/3EV / ±2/3EV / ±1EV); Film simulation modes: 20 different modes: various film types, filters, negative, black&white; Effect modes: monochromatic color, grain effect, color chrome effect, color chrome blue, smooth skin effect, clarity setting (±5 steps)

The Fujifilm GFX100S II is a mirrorless medium format camera produced by Fujifilm with Fujifilm G-mount. It is the direct successor to the 2021 GFX100S.

The GFX100S II was announced by the Fujifilm corporation on 16 May 2024 at the X Summit Sydney 2024 together with the X-T50 and two new lenses. Sales commenced in June 2024. The retail price was set to USD 4,999, which is USD 1,000 less than the initial retail price for its predecessor back in 2021.

== Camera body / battery ==
The size of the GFX100S II is the same as its predecessor. The new body weighs slightly less at 883 g (1.947 lb) including battery (versus 900 g (2.0 lb)) and it now sports the same BISHAMON-TEX finish as the GFX top model GFX 100 II announced in 2023.

The GFX100S II has retained the single NP-W235 battery of the GFX100S, but the service range has been extended:

- 530 images (CIPA) versus 460
- 80 min. of 4k video recording as opposed to 60 min.

== Processor ==
The GFX100S II has the latest X-Processor5, which provides enhanced shooting speed, improved autofocus, reduced rolling shutter, and a higher-quality video mode. The mechanical burst speed rises from 5 to 7 fps.

== Sensor ==
The Fujifilm GFX100S II uses the GMX series' 102MP 43.8 × 32.9 mm, 11648 × 8736 pixel medium format sensor with 100% phase-detection autofocus coverage. Compared to its predecessor some improvements have been added, such as redesigned microlenses for enhanced autofocus and better image quality at the extreme edges, a faster readout speed, and the standard sensitivity lowered to 80 ISO. The extended lower ISO value has been reduced to 40.

== Autofocus / Stabiliser ==
The autofocus system of the Fujifilm GFX100S II now offers subject recognition for insects and drones.
The Fujifilm GFX100S II contains an enhanced in-body image stabilization (IBIS) mechanism with 5-axis stabilization. The manufacturer claims a shake compensation effect of up to 8.0 stops in combination with compatible lenses.

== Viewfinder ==
The fixed OLED electronic viewfinder (EVF) has now been upgraded to 5.76M dots and a magnification ration of 0.84×. Coverage of image: 100%.

== Rear monitor / top screen ==
The 3.2 inch, 2.36 M pixel, three-way tilting, colour LCD, touch screen rear monitor is identical to that of the GFX 100S. The 1.8 inch high-contrast monochrome e-ink top screen enables checking camera settings at a glance, even in bright sunlight, and may be customized to display virtual dials (aperture, shutter speed, ISO), a live histogram, or other information.

== Film simulation modes ==
In keeping with all Fujifilm digital cameras, the GFX100S II offers a wide range of film simulations, including the newly introduced REALA ACE, thus totaling 20.

== Pixel shift ==
The Fujifilm GFX100S II is equipped with a Pixel shift multi-shot capability, which allows its sensor to move in half-pixel increments thus enabling both true-colour and ultra-high resolution images (400 MP).

== Multiple exposure / Bracketing ==
The multiple exposure and bracketing capabilities of the Fujifilm GFX100S II remain unchanged versus its predecessor.
Multiple exposures may be taken with up to 9 frames combining a variety of overlay modes.
Six different bracketing modes are provided:AE bracketing, film simulation bracketing, dynamic range bracketing, ISO sensitivity bracketing, white balance bracketing, focus bracketing.

== Storage formats (stills) ==
Still images may now also be stored as HEIF format (4:2:2 10-bit) besides the previously available JPEG (Exif v2.3), TIFF (8/16-bit), and Raw (Fujifilm .RAF) (14/16-bit RAF) formats.

== Video ==
As its predecessor, the Fujifilm GFX100S II is capable of recording 4K video at 25 or 30 fps using the full sensor width.

- 4K video may be set to 16:9 or 17:9 output
- Other intermediate and lower resolution modes available

Both Apple ProRes 422 footage and other video output may be directly routed via USB-C cable to an external SSD. Likewise a ProRes RAW or Blackmagic Raw encoded data stream may be transferred over its HDMI socket to a compatible Atomos or Blackmagic external recorder.

A faster sensor output in comparison to its predecessor reduces rolling shutter and the maximum attainable quality is now 4K / 30 fps video with 10-bit 4:2:2 options (for either H.264 or H.265 modes), thus extending video sampling up to 720 mbps (megabits per sec.).

The GFX100S II has gained not only a new F-Log2 profile but also both waveforms and vectorscope displays to assist with proper video exposure.

== Summary of improvements versus predecessor ==
The mark II version of the Fujifilm GFX100S employs the following improvements as compared to its predecessor:

- improved sensor:
  - redesigned microlenses for enhanced autofocus and better image quality at the extreme edges of the sensor
  - faster readout speed
  - lowest standard sensitivity now 80 ISO
    extended low now 40 ISO
- latest X-Processor5 model
- autofocus with extended subject recognition
- continuous shooting extended to 7 fps
- viewfínder now 5.76M dots OLED, 84% magnification
- IBIS now reduces shake by up to 8.0 stops in combination with compatible lenses
- added film simulation REALA ACE (now 20)
- video:
  - 4K video / 30p, now with 10-bit 4:2:2 option
  - F-Log2 mode
  - output to external SSD via USB-C port
- slightly reduced weight 883 g
- improved surface texture
- same NP-W235 battery, now extended range:
  - 530 versus 460 images
  - 80 min. of 4k video recording as opposed to 60 min.
- initial retail price reduced by USD 1,000

== See also ==
- Fujifilm GFX100S
- Fujifilm G-mount

Type	Lens	2011	2012	2013	2014	2015	2016	2017	2018	2019	2020	2021	2022	2023	2024	2025	2026
MILC	G-mount; Medium format sensor							GFX 50S ^{F} ^{T}					GFX 50S II ^{F} ^{T}				
MILC	G-mount; Medium format sensor									GFX 50R ^{F} ^{T}							
MILC	G-mount; Medium format sensor										GFX 100 ^{F} ^{T}					GFX 100 II ^{F} ^{T}	
MILC	G-mount; Medium format sensor											GFX 100 IR ^{F} ^{T}					
MILC	G-mount; Medium format sensor											GFX 100S ^{F} ^{T}				GFX 100S II ^{F} ^{T}	
MILC	G-mount; Medium format sensor															GFX Eterna 55 ^{F} ^{T}	
MILC	Prime lens Medium format sensor															GFX 100RF ^{F} ^{T}	
MILC	X-mount; APS-C sensor		X-Pro1				X-Pro2				X-Pro3 ^{f} ^{T}						
MILC	X-mount; APS-C sensor								X-H1 ^{F} ^{T}					X-H2 ^{A} ^{T}			
MILC	X-mount; APS-C sensor													X-H2S ^{A} ^{T}			
MILC	X-mount; APS-C sensor											X-S10 ^{A} ^{T}			X-S20 ^{A} ^{T}		
MILC	X-mount; APS-C sensor				X-T1 ^{f}			X-T2 ^{F}		X-T3 ^{F} ^{T}		X-T4 ^{A} ^{T}		X-T5 ^{F} ^{T}			
MILC	X-mount; APS-C sensor															X-T50 ^{f} ^{T}	
MILC	X-mount; APS-C sensor						X-T10 ^{f}	X-T20 ^{f} ^{T}		X-T30 ^{f} ^{T}			X-T30 II ^{f} ^{T}			X-T30 III ^{f} ^{T}	
MILC	X-mount; APS-C sensor									_{15} X-T100 ^{F} ^{T}	X-T200 ^{A} ^{T}						
MILC	X-mount; APS-C sensor			X-E1	X-E2		X-E2s		X-E3 ^{T}			X-E4 ^{f} ^{T}				X-E5 ^{f} ^{T}	
MILC	X-mount; APS-C sensor				X-M1 ^{f}											X-M5 ^{A} ^{T}	
MILC	X-mount; APS-C sensor				X-A1 ^{f}	X-A2 ^{f}		X-A3 ^{f} ^{T}	_{15} X-A5 ^{f} ^{T}		X-A7 ^{A} ^{T}						
MILC	X-mount; APS-C sensor							X-A10 ^{f}	X-A20 ^{f} ^{T}								
Compact	Prime lens APS-C sensor	X100		X100S		X100T		X100F			X100V ^{f} ^{T}				X100VI ^{f} ^{T}		
Compact	Prime lens APS-C sensor						X70 ^{f} ^{T}			XF10 ^{T}							
Compact	Prime lens 1" sensor															X half ^{T}	
Compact	Zoom lens^{2}/_{3}" sensor		X10	X20		X30 ^{f}											
Compact	Zoom lens^{2}/_{3}" sensor				XQ1	XQ2											
Compact	Zoom lens^{2}/_{3}" sensor			XF1													
Bridge	^{2}/_{3}" sensor		X-S1 ^{f}														
Type	Lens																
Type	Lens	2011	2012	2013	2014	2015	2016	2017	2018	2019	2020	2021	2022	2023	2024	2025	2026
