= Pixel shift =

Super-resolution imaging technique

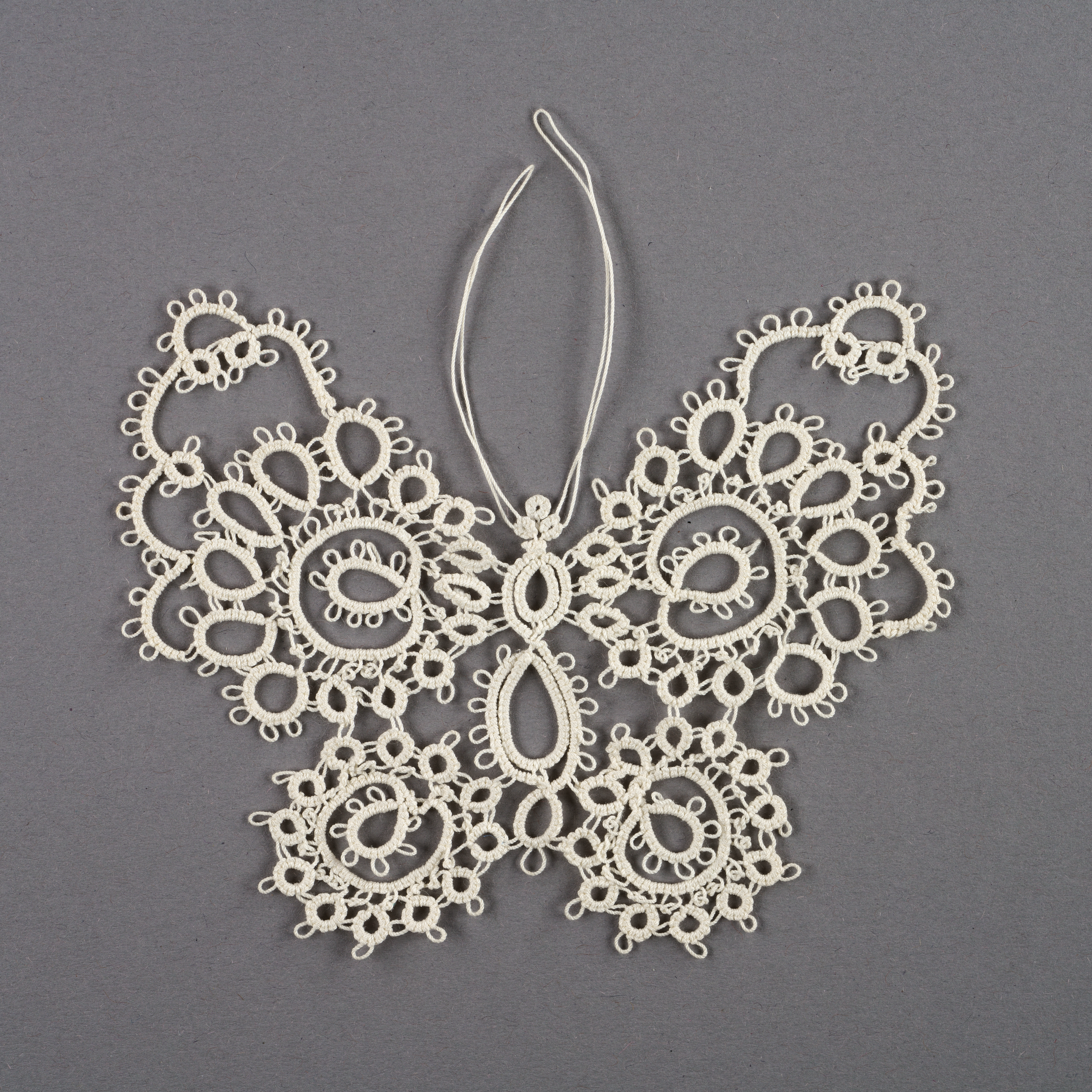
This very fine level of resolution was derived by merging four precursor images taken at sensor positions just one pixel apart.

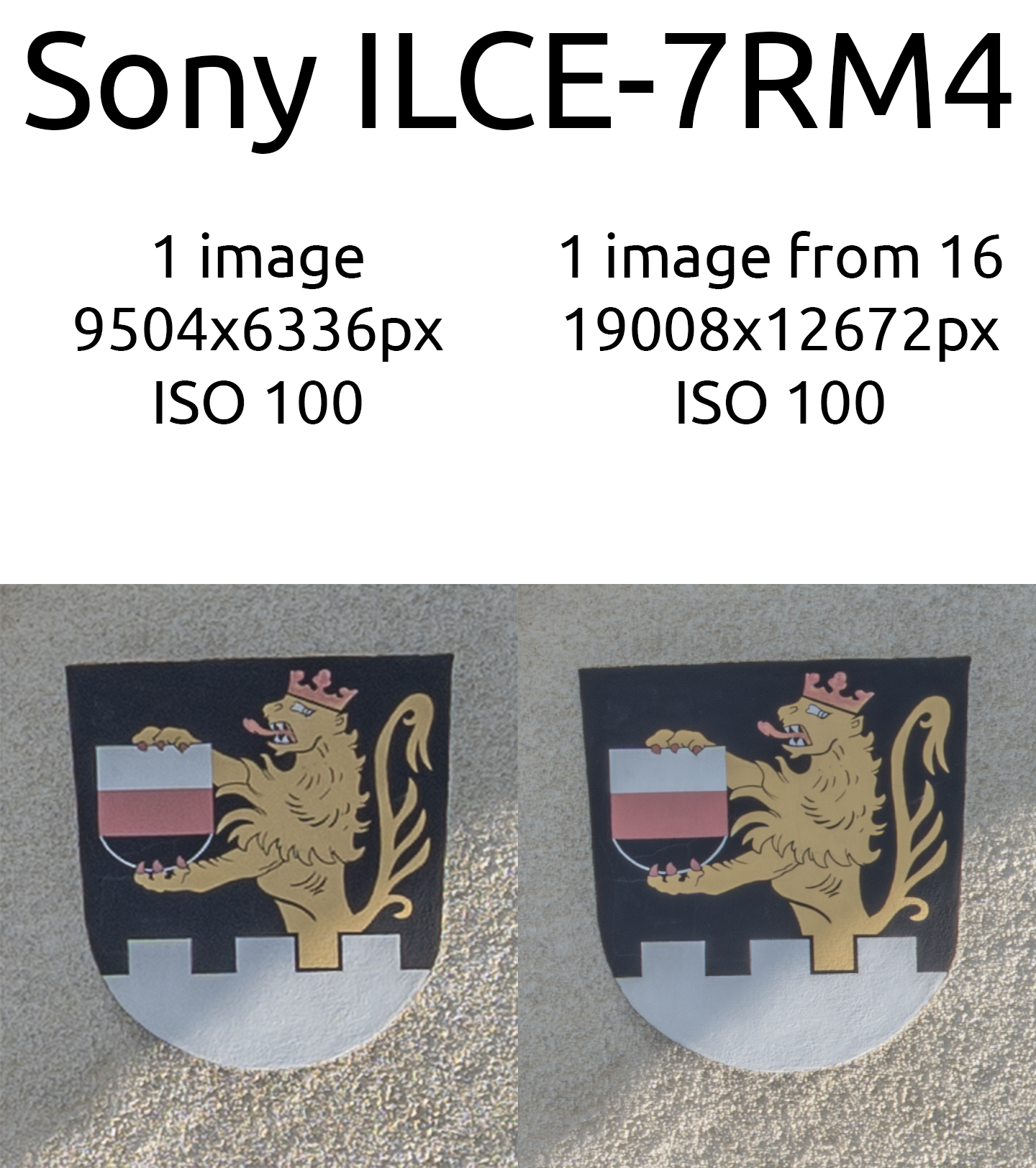
Comparison of simple image (left) and image generated with pixel shift (right) (Click to enlarge)

In digital photography, pixel shift is a method to create a super-resolution image using a digital camera. The method works by taking several images, after each such capture moving ("shifting") the sensor to a new position. In digital colour cameras that employ pixel shift, this avoids a major limitation inherent in using Bayer pattern for obtaining colour, and instead produces an image with increased colour resolution and, assuming a static subject or additional computational steps, an image free of colour moiré. Taking this idea further, sub-pixel shifting may increase the resolution of the final image beyond that suggested by the specified resolution of the image sensor.

Additionally, assuming that the various individual captures are taken at the same sensitivity, the final combined image will have less image noise than a single capture. This can be thought of as an averaging effect (for instance, in a pixel shift image composed of four individual frames with a classic Bayer pattern, every pixel in the final colour image is based on two measurements of the green channel).

== List of cameras implementing pixel shift ==
All of the following cameras are fabricated with one imaging sensor, thus any kind of pixel shift requires a movement of the whole sensor.

=== Canon ===
- Canon R5: Contains a 45 Mpixel sensor. The High-Resolution Mode shifts the sensor by one pixel to obtain a sequence of nine images that are merged into a 400 Mpixel image.

=== Fujifilm ===
- Fujifilm GFX50S II: contains a 51 Mpixel sensor. The Pixel Shift Multi-Shot mode shifts the imaging sensor by 0.5-pixel movements to obtain a sequence of 16 images that are subsequently merged into a 200 Mpixel image.
- Fujifilm GFX100, Fujifilm GFX100 II: contains a 102 Mpixel sensor. A sequence of 16 pixel shifted images are merged into a 400 Mpixel image.
- Fujifilm GFX100S, Fujifilm GFX100S II: contains a 102 Mpixel sensor. A sequence of 16 pixel shifted images are merged into a 400 Mpixel image
- Fujifilm GFX100IR: contains a 102 Mpixel sensor. A sequence of 16 pixel shifted images are merged into a 400 Mpixel image
- Fujifilm X-H2: contains a 40 Mpixel sensor. A sequence of 20 shifted images are merged into a 160 Mpixel image.
- Fujifilm X-T5: contains a 40 Mpixel sensor. A sequence of 20 shifted images are merged into a 160 Mpixel image.

=== Nikon ===
- Nikon Z8: contains a 47.5 Mpixel sensor. The High Res shot mode shifts the imaging sensor by 0.5-pixel movements to obtain a sequence of up to 32 images that can be merged in Nikon's NX studio software.
- Nikon Zf: contains a 24 Mpixel sensor. The High Res shot mode shifts the imaging sensor by 0.5-pixel movements to obtain a sequence of up to 32 images that can be merged in Nikon's NX studio software.
- Nikon Z6III
- Nikon Z5II
- Nikon Z5IIC
- Nikon ZR

=== Olympus ===
- Olympus OM-D E-M1 Mark II: contains a 20.4 Mpixel sensor. The High Res shot mode produces a 50 Mpixel image.
- Olympus OM-D E-M5 Mark II: contains a 16 Mpixel sensor. The High Res shot mode shifts the imaging sensor by 0.5-pixel movements to obtain a sequence of 8 images that are subsequently merged into a 40 Mpixel image.
- Olympus OM-D E-M5 Mark III: contains a 20.4 Mpixel sensor. The High Res shot mode shifts the imaging sensor by 0.5-pixel movements to obtain a sequence of 8 images that are subsequently merged into a 50 Mpixel image.
- Olympus OM-D E-M1X: contains a 20.4 Mpixel sensor. The camera sports two pixel shift mode: (a) the 80Mp Tripod mode produces an 80 Mpixel image, (b) the Handheld High Res shot mode produces a 50 Mpixel image.
- Olympus PEN-F: contains a 20.4 Mpixel sensor. The High Res Shot mode takes multiple images, continually shifting the position of the sensor in sub-pixel increments. Combining these images results in either a 50MP JPEG or an 80MP Raw file.

==== OM System ====
- OM System OM-1: contains a 20MPix sensor. The High Res Shot mode takes multiple images, and it can be used handheld or on a tripod. Handheld it will internally produce 50 Mpix files and 80 Mpix when mounted on a tripod.
- OM System OM-5: contains a 20MPix sensor. The High Res Shot mode takes multiple images, and it can be used handheld or on a tripod. Handheld it will internally produce 50 Mpix files and 80 Mpix when mounted on a tripod.

=== Panasonic ===
- Panasonic Lumix DC-G9: contains a 20.3 Mpixel sensor. The High Resolution Mode takes a sequence of 8 shots in quick succession between which the sensor is shifted by 0.5 pixel for each image. These are subsequently merged into an 80 Mpixel image.
- Panasonic Lumix DC-S1: contains a 24.2 Mpixel sensor. The High Resolution Mode takes a sequence of shots in quick succession between which the sensor is shifted by a small amount. These are subsequently merged into a 96 Mpixel image.
- Panasonic Lumix DC-S1R: contains a 47.3 Mpixel sensor. The High Resolution Mode shifts the imaging sensor by a small increments to obtain a sequence of 8 images that are subsequently merged into a 187 Mpixel image.
- Panasonic Lumix DC-S1H
- Panasonic Lumix DC-S5

=== Pentax ===
- Pentax K-70: contains a 24.3 Mpixel sensor. The pixel shift mode takes a sequence of 4 shots between which the sensor is shifted by 1 pixel. These are subsequently merged into an image sporting 'all color data in each pixel to deliver super-high-resolution images'.
- Pentax KP: contains a 24.3 Mpixel sensor. The pixel shift mode takes a sequence of 4 shots between which the sensor is shifted by 1 pixel. These are subsequently merged into an image sporting 'high-resolution images with more accurate colours and much finer details'.
- Pentax K-3 II: contains a 24.3 Mpixel sensor. The pixel shift mode takes a sequence of 4 shots between which the sensor is shifted by 1 pixel. These are subsequently merged into an image sporting 'super-high-resolution images with far more truthful color reproduction and much finer details'.
- Pentax K-3 III: contains a 25.7 Mpixel sensor. The pixel shift mode takes a sequence of 4 shots between which the sensor is shifted by 1 pixel. These are subsequently merged into an image sporting 'a cancelling out of the Bayer pattern and removal of the need for sharpness-sapping demosaicing'.
- Pentax K-1: contains a 36.4 Mpixel sensor. The pixel shift mode takes a sequence of 4 shots between which the sensor is shifted by 1 pixel. These are subsequently merged into an image sporting 'improved detail and colour resolution'.
- Pentax K-1 II: contains a 36.4 Mpixel sensor. The camera sports two pixel shift mode: (a) a series of 4 tripod-stabilised images shifted by 1 pixel each are subsequently combined into a 47.3 Mpixel image, (b) a series of images taken in handheld mode are combined into a 47.3 Mpixel image that is, within limits, able to cope even with moving subjects.

=== Sony ===
- Sony a6600: contains a 24.3 Mpixel sensor. The pixel shift mode takes a sequence of 4 shots between which the sensor is shifted by 1 pixel. These are subsequently merged into an image sporting 'all color data in each pixel to deliver super-high-resolution images'. This needs checking, many other sources show the a6600 does not have this feature.
- Sony α7R III: contains a 42.4 Mpixel sensor. The pixel shift mode takes a sequence of 4 shots between which the sensor is shifted by 1 pixel. These are subsequently merged into a 42.4 Mpixel image with improved tonal resolution.
- Sony α7R IV: contains a 61 Mpixel sensor. The camera has two pixel shift modes, (a) the first takes a sequence of 4 shots between which the sensor is shifted by 1 pixel. These are subsequently merged into a 61 Mpixel image with improved tonal resolution, (b) the other takes a sequence of 16 shots between which the sensor is shifted by 0.5 pixel. These are subsequently merged into a 240 Mpixel image with both enhanced detail and improved tonal resolution.
- Sony α1: contains a 50 Mpixel sensor. The camera has two pixel shift modes, (a) the first takes a sequence of 4 shots between which the sensor is shifted by 1 pixel. These are subsequently merged into a 50 Mpixel image with improved tonal resolution, (b) the other takes a sequence of 16 shots between which the sensor is shifted by 0.5 pixel. These are subsequently merged into a 200 Mpixel image with both enhanced detail and improved tonal resolution.

=== Hasselblad ===
- Hasselblad H3DII: the model H3DII-39 sports a 39 Mpixel sensor, the model H3DII-50 a 50 Mpixel sensor. Both enable a pixel shift mode which takes a sequence of 4 shots between which the sensor is shifted by 1 pixel. These are subsequently merged into a single image.
- Hasselblad H4D series: the model H4D-200MS contains a 50 Mpixel sensor. The sensor sports 3 different pixel shift modes which take (a) a sequence of 6 shots taken at slight offsets, (b) a sequence of 4 shots between which the sensor is shifted by 1 pixel, (c) a sequence of 4 shots between which the sensor is shifted by 0.5 pixels. Images obtained by all three modes are subsequently merged into 200 Mpixel images.
- Hasselblad H5D series: both models H5D-50c MS and H5D-200c MS contain a 50 Mpixel sensor. This sensor sports 2 different pixel shift modes which take (a) a sequence of 6 shots with full and half pixel movements, (b) a sequence of 4 shots between which the sensor is shifted by exactly 1 pixel. Images obtained by both modes are subsequently merged into 200 Mpixel images.
- Hasselblad H6D-400c MS: the model H6D-400c contains a 100 Mpixel sensor. The camera provides two so called 'Multi-Shot modes', one that comprises a sequence of 4 shots, the other a total of 6 shots. Both involve moving the sensor by one pixel between shots to achieve real colour data for every pixel. The 6-shot Multi-Shot mode provides an additional two exposures, whereby the sensor is repositioned by 0.5 pixel horizontally and 0.5 pixel vertically. Four Multi-Shot images result in a 100 Mpixel image, a series of six Multi-Shot images is combined into a 400 Mpixel 16-bit TIFF image sporting a resolution of 23200 × 17400 pixels and sized at 2.4 GB.

=== JVC ===
- JVC GZ-HD3
- JVC GZ-HD7

== See also ==
- Pixel shifting
