= Pentax K-3 Mark III =

Digital camera in the Pentax APS-C line

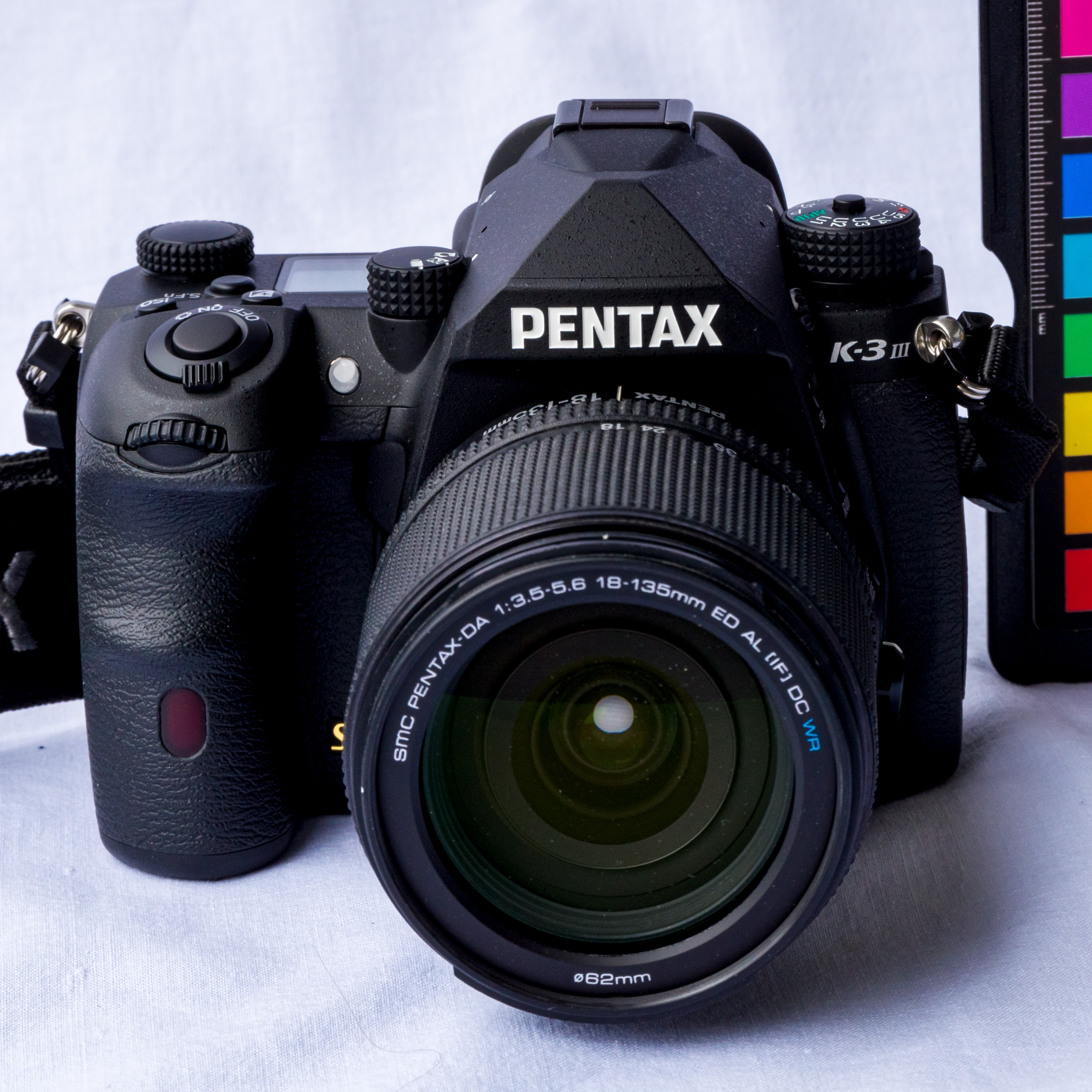
- Pentax K-3 Mark III

Overview
- Maker: Ricoh
- Type: Digital single-lens reflex camera
- Released: 23 April 2021; 5 years ago
- Intro price: $1,900 USD

Lens
- Lens mount: Pentax KAF2
- Lens: Interchangeable lens

Sensor/medium
- Sensor type: BSI-CMOS, without low-pass filter
- Sensor size: 23.3×15.5 mm (APS-C type)
- Sensor maker: Sony
- Maximum resolution: 6192×4128 (25.73 megapixels)
- Film speed: ISO 100-1,600,000
- Recording medium: Dual SD, SDHC or SDXC card slots (Slot 1 UHS-II, Slot 2 UHS-I)

Focusing
- Focus: 101 point Phase detection autofocus, 25 cross type, autofocus working range from -4 EV to 18 EV, contrast detection autofocus
- Focus modes: Single AF (AF.S), Continuous AF (AF.C), Auto select AF (AF.A)
- Focus areas: Auto Area, Select, Zone Select, Expanded Select Area (S, M or L), Select S, Spot.

Exposure/metering
- Exposure bracketing: Yes (5 stops)
- Exposure modes: Scene Analyze Auto, Manual (M), Aperture Priority (Av), Shutter Priority (Tv), Shutter and Aperture Priority (TAv), Sensitivity Priority (Sv), Flexible Program (P), Bulb (B), 5 User Modes
- Exposure metering: TTL open aperture metering using 307.000 pixel RGB sensor
- Metering modes: Multi-segment, Center-weighted and Spot metering

Flash
- Flash: External only: 1/200 X-sync speed, hot shoe for P-TTL flash units with high-speed sync support, X-sync socket

Shutter
- Shutter: Electronically controlled vertical-run focal plane shutter, Electronic Shutter.
- Shutter speeds: Mechanical shutter: 1/8000 to 30 sec, Bulb; Electronic shutter: 1/16000 to 30 sec
- Continuous shooting: up to 12 fps for 37 JPG or 30 RAW images (11 fps with AF.C)

Viewfinder
- Viewfinder: Optical (Pentaprism)
- Viewfinder magnification: 1.05
- Frame coverage: 100%

Image processing
- Image processor: PRIME V with Accelerator Unit II
- White balance: Auto, Daylight, Cloudy, Shade, Tungsten/Incandescent, Fluorescent, CTE, Manual, 3 user presets
- Dynamic range compressor: Highlight and Shadow Correction

General
- Video recording: 1920×1080 (60p/30p//24p） 4K (30p/24p)
- LCD screen: 3.2 inch GFZ LCD touchscreen with 1,620,000 dots
- Battery: D-Li90P (body USB rechargeable)
- Optional battery packs: D-BG8
- AV port(s): USB 3.2 Type-C, HDMI (Type D), external power supply, external cable switch, X-sync socket, Stereo microphone input, Headphone output
- Data port(s): IEEE802.11 b/g/n, Bluetooth 4.2
- Body features: Shake Reduction II, magnesium alloy, dustproof, weather-resistant and -10°C (14°F) cold-resistant construction
- Dimensions: 134.5×103.5×73.5 mm (5.30×4.07×2.89 in)
- Weight: 735 g (25.9 oz) (body only); 820 g (29 oz) (including battery and SD Card)
- Made in: Philippines

Chronology
- Predecessor: Pentax K-3 II

References
- https://www.ricoh-imaging.co.jp/english/products/k-3-3/spec/

The Pentax K-3 Mark III is a professional digital single-lens reflex camera released by Ricoh Imaging on 23 April 2021. It was developed as the flagship model of the Pentax APS-C camera range. It has a 1/8000 conventional and 1/16,000 electronic shutter (via firmware update). It also has familiar Pentax features, such as Astrotracer, Pixel Shift Resolution, AA Filter simulator, as well as Depth-of-field, Shutter, and Motion Bracketing. This is the first Pentax camera with 4K video recording and a touchscreen.

The camera was discontinued in January 2025, although its monochrome version remained in production until March 2026.

== Gallery ==
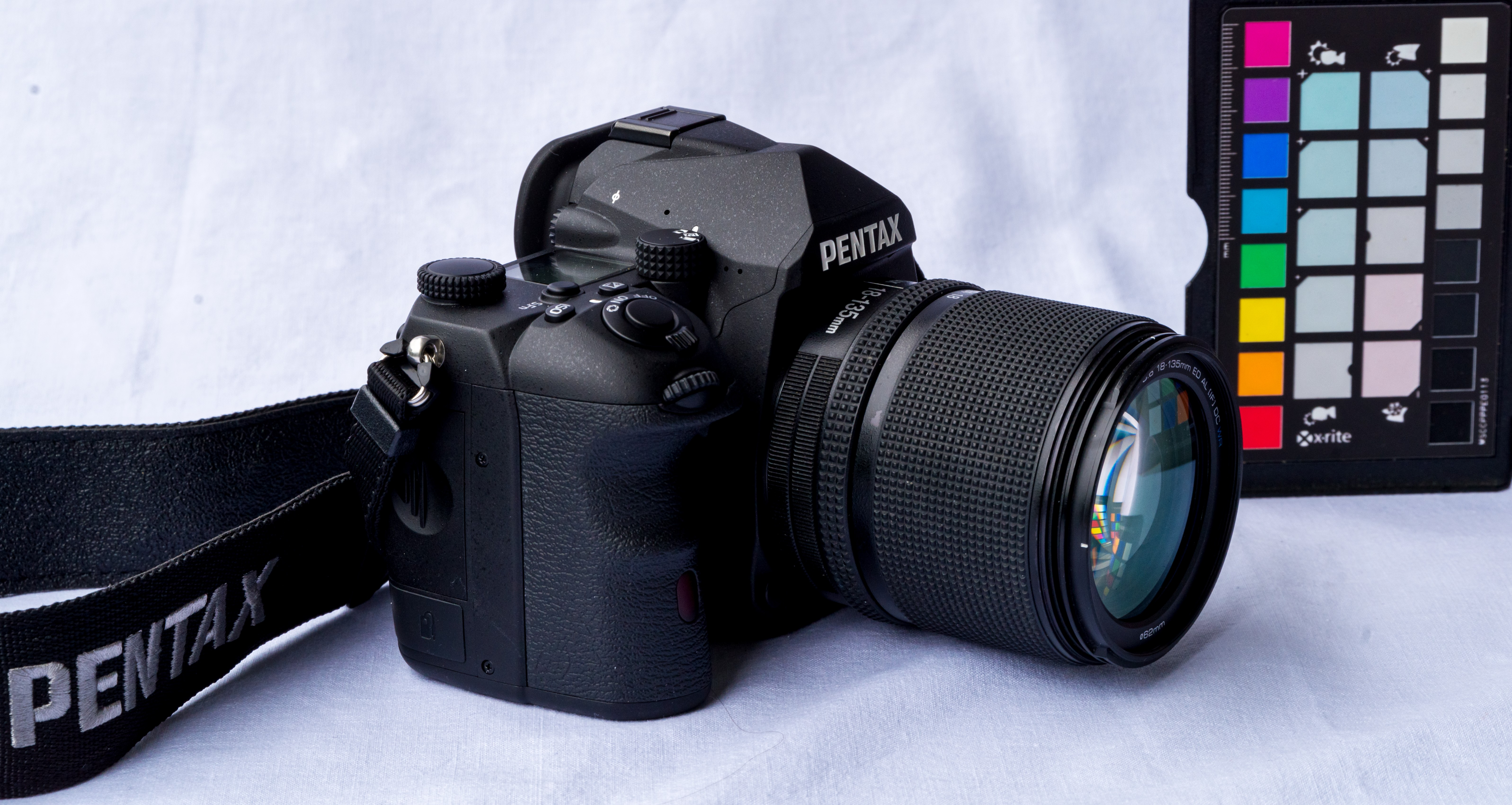

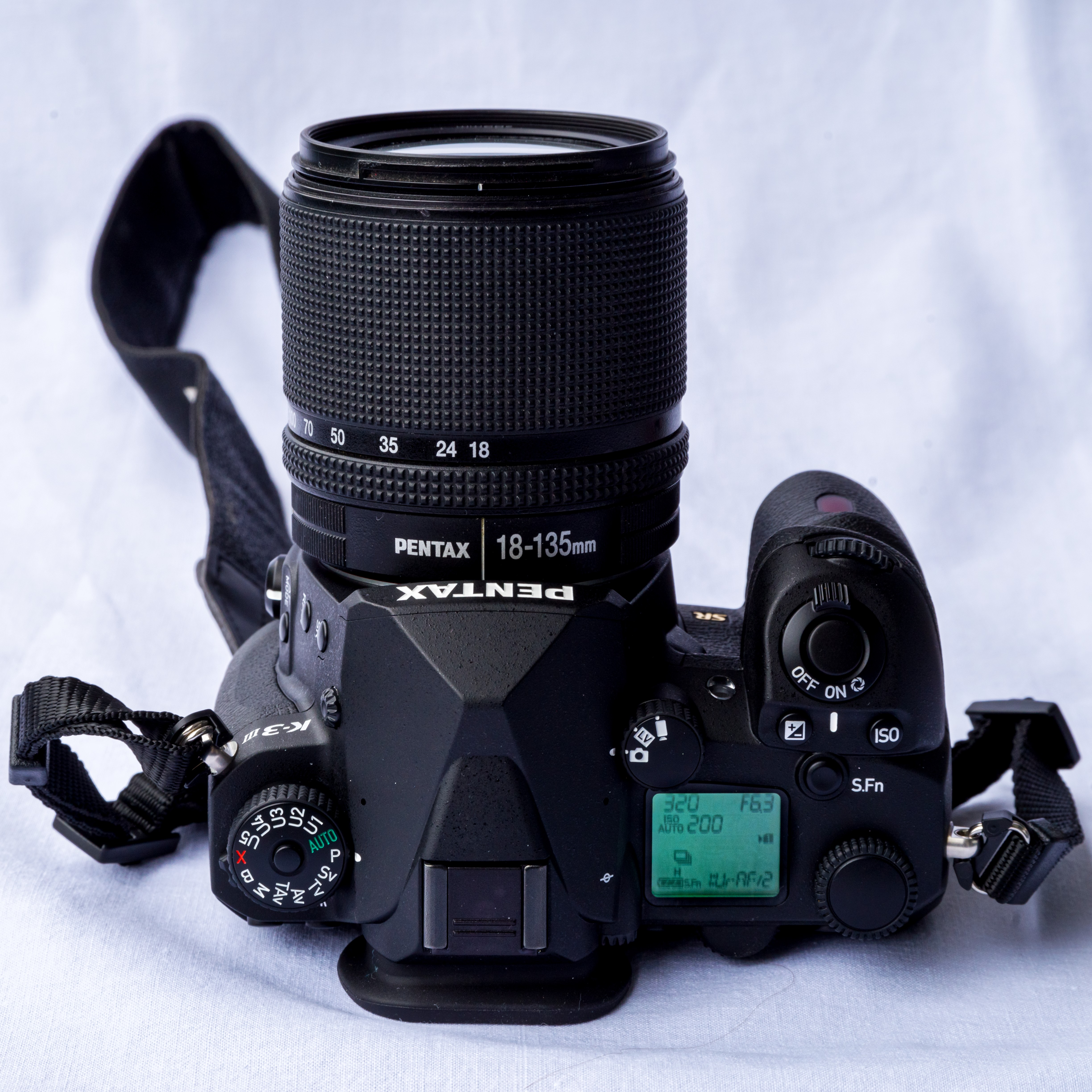

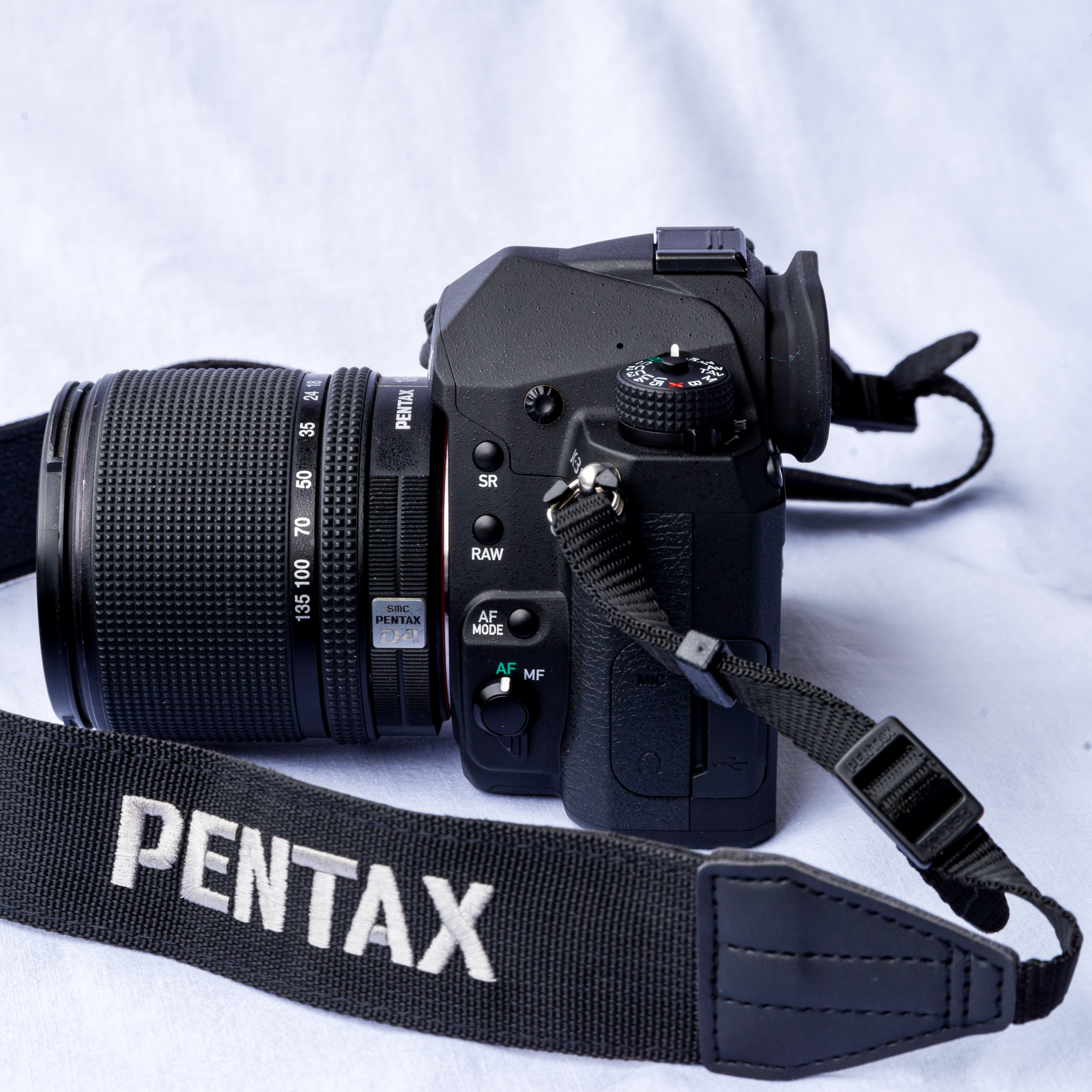

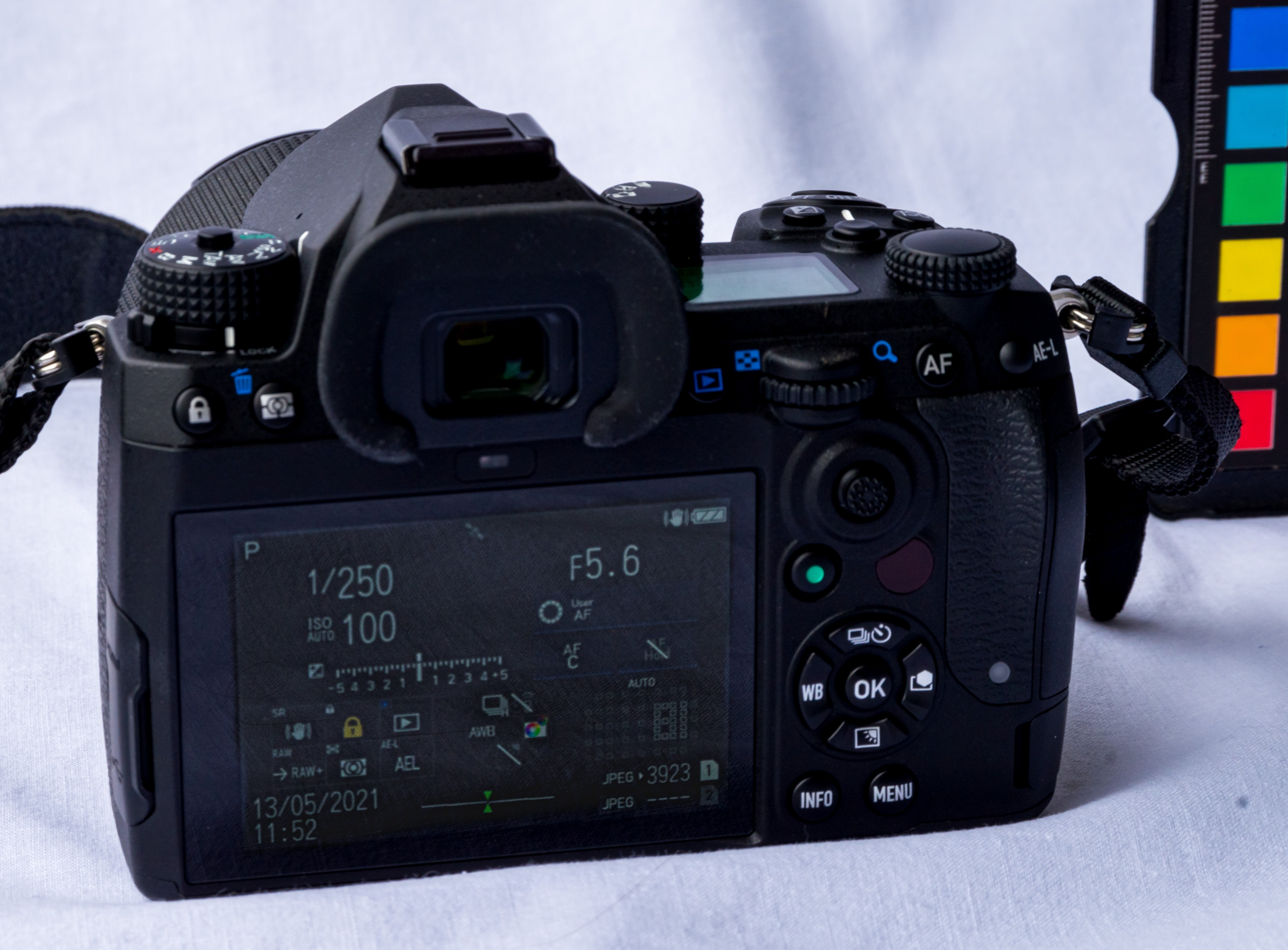

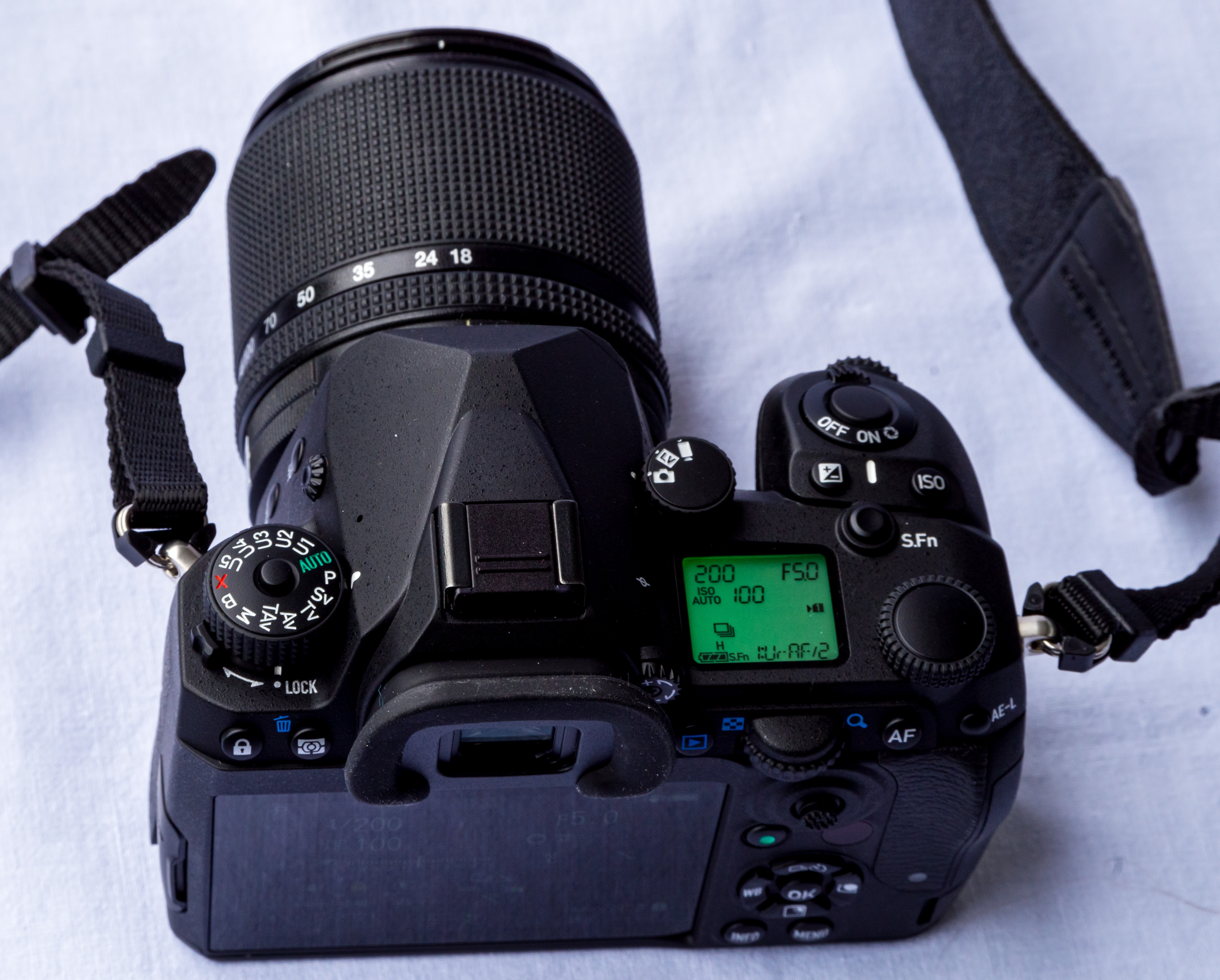

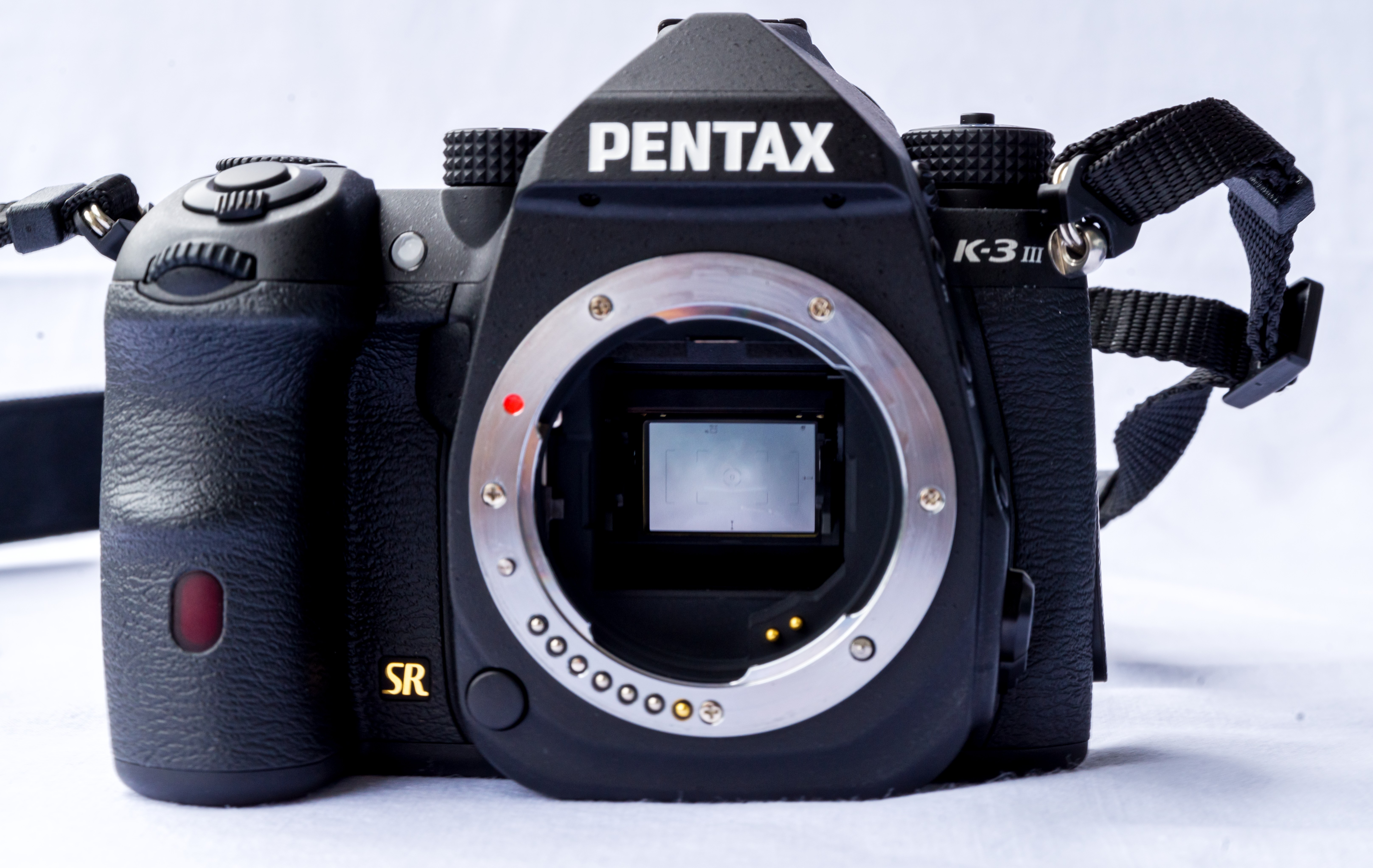

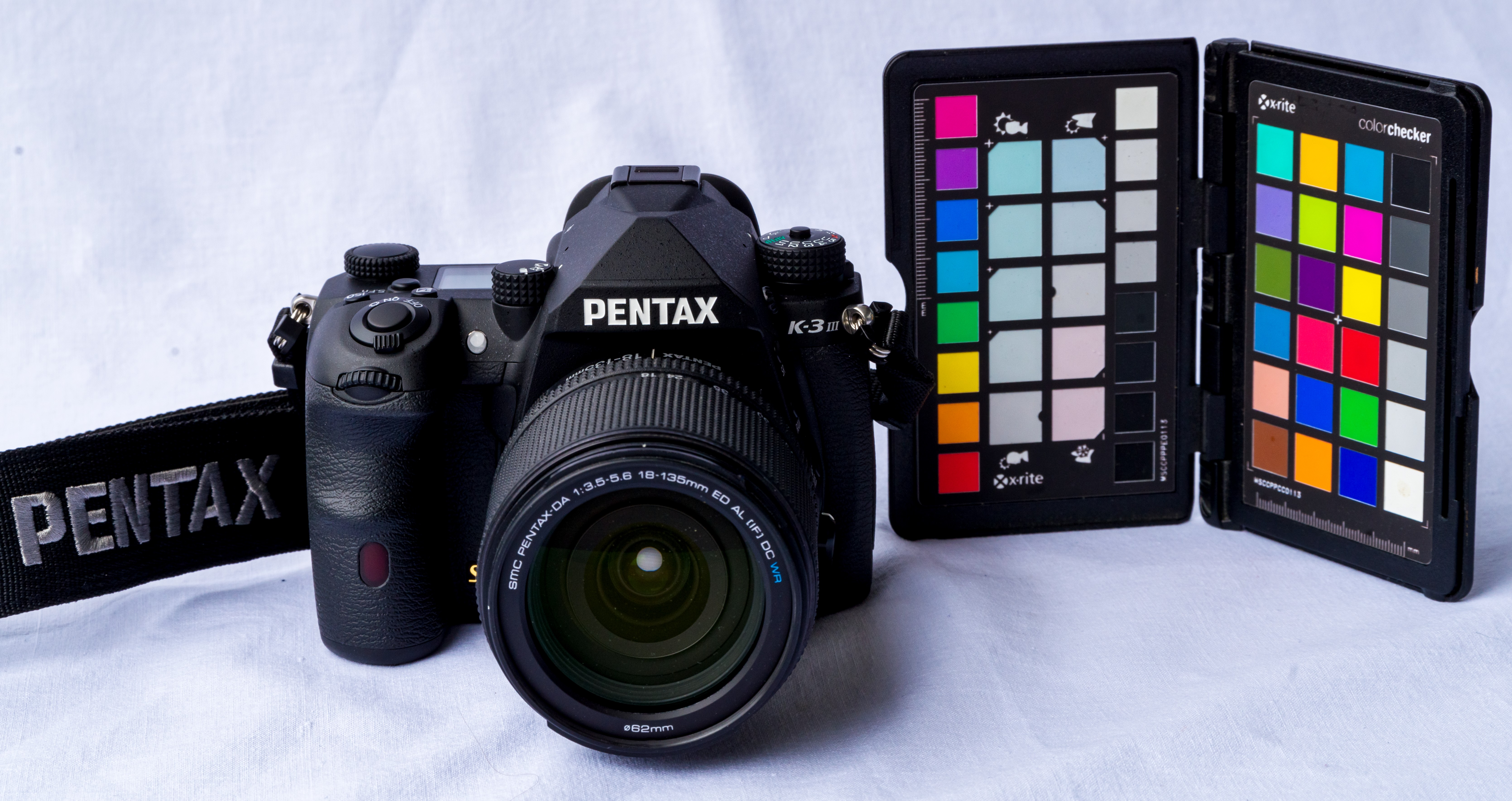

Type	Sensor	Class	2003	2004	2005	2006		2007	2008	2009	2010	2011	2012	2013	2014	2015	2016	2017	2018	2019	2020	2021	2022	2023	2024	2025
DSLR	MF	Professional										645D				645Z										
DSLR	FF	Professional																K-1		K-1 II						
DSLR	APS-C	High-end															K-3 II						K-3 III			
DSLR	APS-C	High-end													K-3											
DSLR	APS-C	Advanced									K-7	K-5		K-5 II / K-5 IIs												
DSLR	APS-C	Advanced		*ist D			K10D		K20D									KP								
DSLR	APS-C	Midrange					K100D	100DS	K200D					K-30	K-50			K-70						KF		
DSLR	APS-C	Entry-level			*ist DS	*ist DS2						K-r			K-500	K-S2										
DSLR	APS-C	Entry-level			*ist DL	DL2	K110D			K-m/K2000	K-x					K-S1										
MILC	APS-C	K-mount											K-01													
MILC	1/1.7"	Q-mount													Q7											
MILC	1/1.7"	Q-mount														Q-S1										
MILC	1/2.3"	Q-mount											Q	Q10												
DSLR	Prototypes		MZ-D (2000); 645D Prototype (2006); AP 50th Anniv. (2007)																							
Type	Sensor	Class																								
Type	Sensor	Class	2003	2004	2005	2006		2007	2008	2009	2010	2011	2012	2013	2014	2015	2016	2017	2018	2019	2020	2021	2022	2023	2024	2025
