= Fujifilm GFX100 II =

Camera

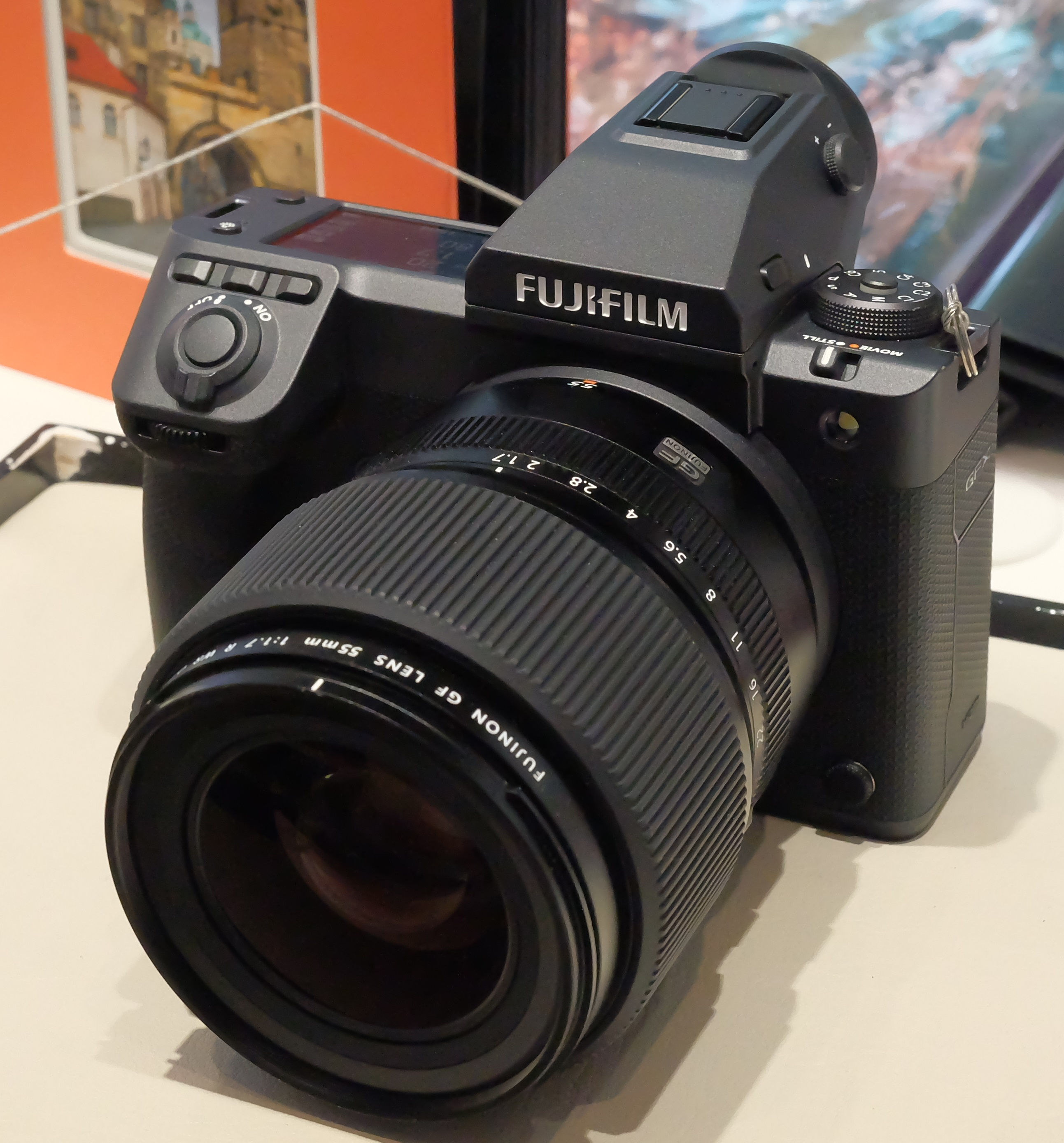
- Fujiilm GFX100 II + GF55mm F1.7 R WR

Overview
- Maker: Fujifilm
- Type: Mirrorless Camera
- Released: September 12, 2023; 3 years ago
- Intro price: USD 7,499 (body)

Lens
- Lens mount: Fujifilm G
- Lens: Interchangeable lens

Sensor/medium
- Sensor type: CMOS with Bayer filter
- Sensor size: 43.8 mm × 32.9 mm (medium format)
- Sensor maker: Sony
- Maximum resolution: 11648 × 8736 (102 megapixels)
- Film speed: ISO 80–12800 (standard); ISO 40–102400 (extended)
- Storage media: SD card (SD, SDHC, SDXC), UHS-I and UHS-II, V90; CFexpress Type B; SSD

Focusing
- Focus: Intelligent Hybrid TTL contrast detection / Phase detection
- Focus modes: Single point, Zone, Wide/Tracking; Face/eye detection; Subject detection: Animal, Bird, Automobile, Motorcycle, Bike, Airplane, Train;
- Focus areas: 117 focus points (13×9 grid): all modes; 425 (25×17 grid): only for manual focus mode or AF mode with single point
- Focus bracketing: Manual: 0-10 s interval, 1–10 step size, 1–999 frames; Auto: set near and distant focus points

Exposure/metering
- Exposure bracketing: 2 / 3 / 5 / 7 / 9 frames; min. bracket step 1/3 EV, max. 3 EV
- Exposure modes: Program, Aperture Priority, Shutter Speed Priority, Manual Exposure
- Exposure metering: TTL 256-zones metering
- Metering modes: Multi, Spot, Average, center weighted

Flash
- Flash: External flash: attached to hot shoe or (by cord) to sync contact
- Flash exposure compensation: TTL: ±5 EV; Manual: 1/512 to 1/1 in 1/3 EV steps (only available when an optional shoe-mounted compatible flash / remote unit is attached and activated)
- Flash synchronization: 1/125 s (both hot shoe and sync contact)
- Flash bracketing: ±1/3 EV / ±2/3 EV / ±1 EV
- Compatible flashes: Fujifilm TTL flash / remote units and compatible

Shutter
- Frame rate: 8.0 fps (mechanical); 5.3 fps (electronic)
- Shutter: Focal Plane Shutter / electronic shutter
- Shutter speed range: 60 min to 1/32000 s (depends on selected mode)
- Shutter speeds: 30 s / 60 min (modes P, A / S, M) to 1/4000 s (mechanical), 30 s / 60 min (modes P, A / S, M) to 1/32000 s (electronic), Bulb mode max. 60 min
- Continuous shooting: JPEG (mechanical and electronic): 1000+ frames continuously; Uncompressed Raw+JPEG (mechanical, 8.0 fps): 55 frames, (electronic, 5.3 fps): 98 frames; complete specifications see .

Viewfinder
- Viewfinder: 0.62 inches 9.44M dots OLED
- Viewfinder magnification: 1.0
- Frame coverage: 100%

Image processing
- Image processor: X-Processor 5
- White balance: Auto: White Priority, Auto, Ambience Priority; Custom: 1, 2, 3; ColourTemp: 2500K to 10000K; Presets: Daylight, Shade, Fluorescent Light: 1, 2, 3, Incandescent Light, Underwater
- WB bracketing: ±1 / ±2 / ±3
- Dynamic range bracketing: 100% / 200% / 400%

General
- Video recording: MP4 / MOV; 8K (1.53x crop): up to 30 fps; 4K full frame: up to 60 fps; 2K / 1080p: up to 120 fps
- LCD screen: 3.2 inch 2.36M dots tilt-type (3-direction) colour LCD touch screen
- Battery: NP-W235 Li-ion (1x)
- AV port(s): 3.5 mm Microphone / remote release, 3.5 mm Headphone, HDMI type A
- Data port(s): USB-C 3.2 Gen2x1, LAN Terminal 1000/100/10, Wi-Fi 5 (a/b/g/n/ac), Bluetooth 4.2
- Body features: In-Body Image Stabilization, Pixel-Shift, Ultra Sonic Vibration Sensor Cleaning system, detachable EVF
- Dimensions: 152.4 mm × 104.2 mm × 117.4 mm (6.00 in × 4.10 in × 4.62 in) (with EVF)
- Weight: 1,030 g (2.27 lb) including battery, memory card and EVF
- Made in: Japan

Chronology
- Predecessor: Fujifilm GFX100; some elements derived from Fujifilm GFX100S
- Successor: not announced

Footnotes
- Extended features: File format specifications: JPEG (Exif Ver. 2.32); TIFF (8bit / 16bit RGB); HEIF (4:2:2 10bit); Raw (.RAF extension); Self-timer: Still pictures: Off, 2s, 10s; Movies: Off, 3s, 5s, 10s; Interval timer shooting: interval, no. shots, starting time, exposure smoothing, interval priority mode; Additional bracketing mode: ISO bracketing (±1/3EV / ±2/3EV / ±1EV); Film simulation modes: 20 different modes: various film types, filters, negative, black&white; Effect modes: monochromatic color, grain effect, color chrome effect, color chrome blue, smooth skin effect, clarity setting (±5 steps)

The Fujifilm GFX100 II is a medium format mirrorless camera produced by Fujifilm with Fujifilm G-mount. It is the direct successor to the 2019 GFX100.

The GFX100 II was announced on 12 September 2023 at the X Summit Global 2023. Sales commenced in September 2023.

== Camera body / battery ==
The GFX100 II has a noticeably smaller and slightly lighter body than the GFX100, mainly due to the fact that the vertical grip is now an optional add-on. Whereas the GFX100 supports two batteries, the GFX100 II provides space for only one NP-W235 Li-ion type battery (same type as GFX100S). The GFX100 II body thus weighs 1,030 g with its single battery, one of two memory cards and EVF attached. This is approximately 370 g lighter than the GFX100 body (1,400 g with two batteries, memory card and EVF).

== Viewfinder ==
The enhanced electronic viewfinder (EVF) (9.44 MP) is detachable, as that of the GFX100, and may be supplemented with an optional tilt accessory.

== Sensor ==
The Fujifilm GFX100 II uses a newly developed high-speed 43.8 x 32.9 mm medium format sensor with 100% phase-detection autofocus coverage. The 102 MP resolution is identical to that of its predecessor, Fujifilm GFX100. In combination with the enhanced image processing engine "X-Processor 5" the camera can deliver up to double the signal readout speed compared to the sensors employed by both predecessors (Fujifilm GFX100 and GFX100S).

== Stabilizer ==
The GFX100 II contains an in-body image stabilization (IBIS) mechanism with 5-axis stabilization. The manufacturer claims a shake compensation effect of up to 8.0 stops.

== Rear monitor / top screen ==
The 3.2 inch, 2.36 M pixel, three-way tilting, colour LCD, touch screen rear monitor is very similar to the GFX 100's. The 2.09 inch high-contrast monochrome top screen enables checking camera settings at a glance, even in bright sunlight, and may be customized to display virtual dials (aperture, shutter speed, ISO), a live histogram, or other information.

== Dust and weather resistance ==
The build quality is high-class with the manufacturer claiming enhanced dust and weather-resistant capabilities. The camera is fully operative at temperatures from a maximum 40 °C to as low as -10 °C.

== Storage formats ==
Still images may now also be stored as HEIF format (4:2:2 10bit) besides JPEG, TIFF, and Raw (Fujifilm .RAF) formats.

== Pixel shift / multiple exposure / bracketing ==
The camera is equipped with a Pixel shift multi-shot capability, which allows its sensor to move incrementally thus enabling both true-colour and ultra-high resolution images (400 MP). It enables taking multiple exposures (up to 9 frames with a variety of overlay modes) and also supports 6 different bracketing modes (AE bracketing, film simulation bracketing, dynamic range bracketing, ISO sensitivity bracketing, white balance bracketing, focus bracketing).

As opposed to the other straightforward bracketing modes focus bracketing comprises two distinct variants: manual and auto.

- Manual focus bracketing: set time interval between shots, step size, (Note: The step size is the increment by which the focus point of the lens advances between shots.) number of frames, and nearest focus position.
- Auto focus bracketing: set time interval between shots, define nearest focus point and then the most distant focus point. Step size and number of frames are calculated automatically.

== Video ==
This camera is capable of recording 4K video using the full sensor and can also natively capture 8K video, albeit with a 1.53× crop, utilising a roughly 29 mm x 16 mm sized region of the sensor.

- 4K video may be set to 16:9 or 17:9 output
- 8K video may be set to 16:9, 17:9, or 2.76:1 output
- Other intermediate and lower resolution modes available

Higher-quality codecs require either fast CFexpress Type B cards or that video output be directly routed via USB-C cable to an external SSD.

As to be expected for a high resolution medium format sensor, rolling shutter is more pronounced in comparison to lower resolution full frame sensors.

== Lenses ==
The native Fujifilm G-mount lenses manufactured by the Fujifilm company bear the official designation Fujinon GF, as inscribed on the perimeter of the lens barrel. This Fujifilm G-mount table lists not only Fujinon lenses, but also G-mount-compatible lenses presented by other manufacturers.

== Images ==
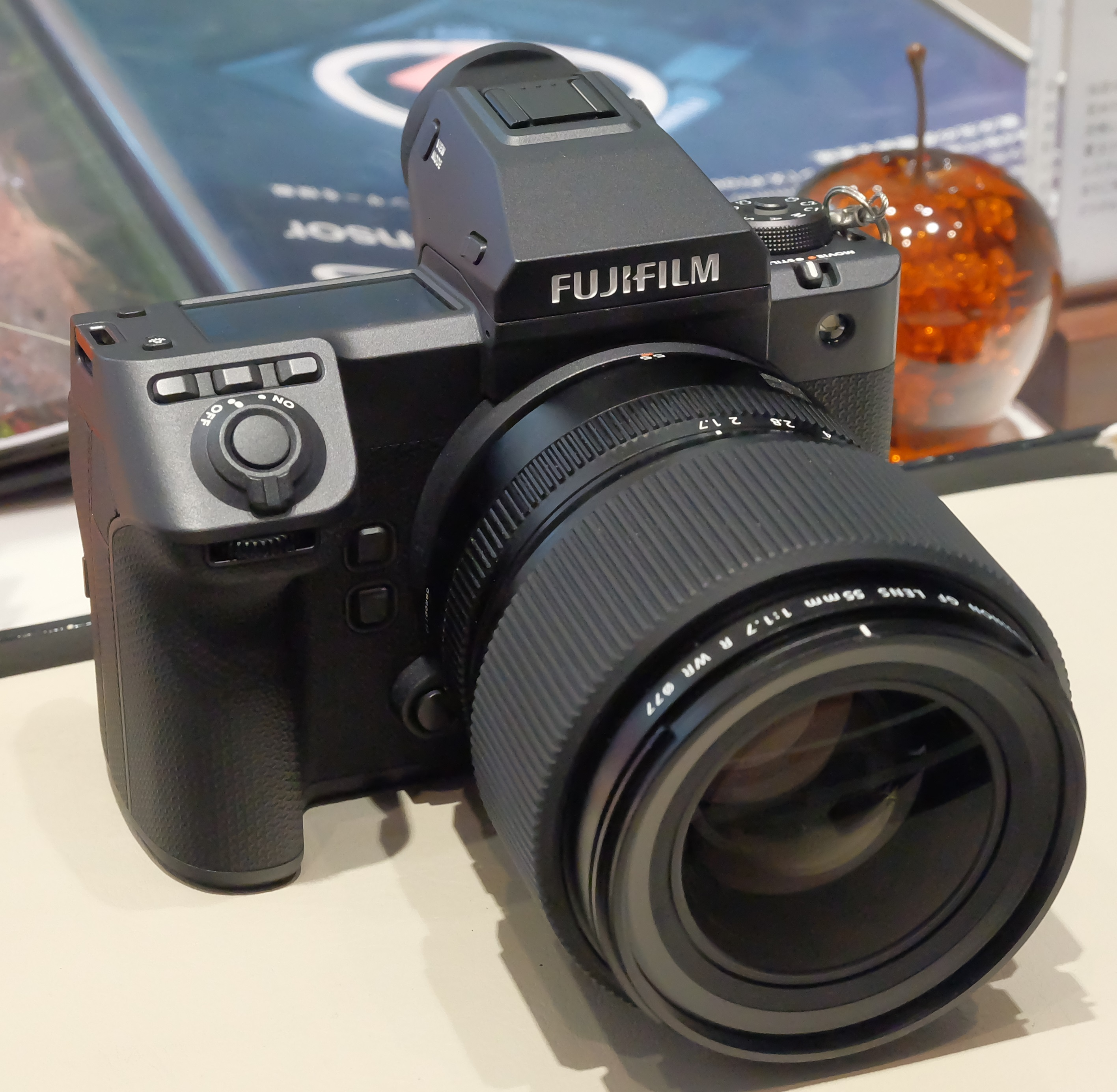

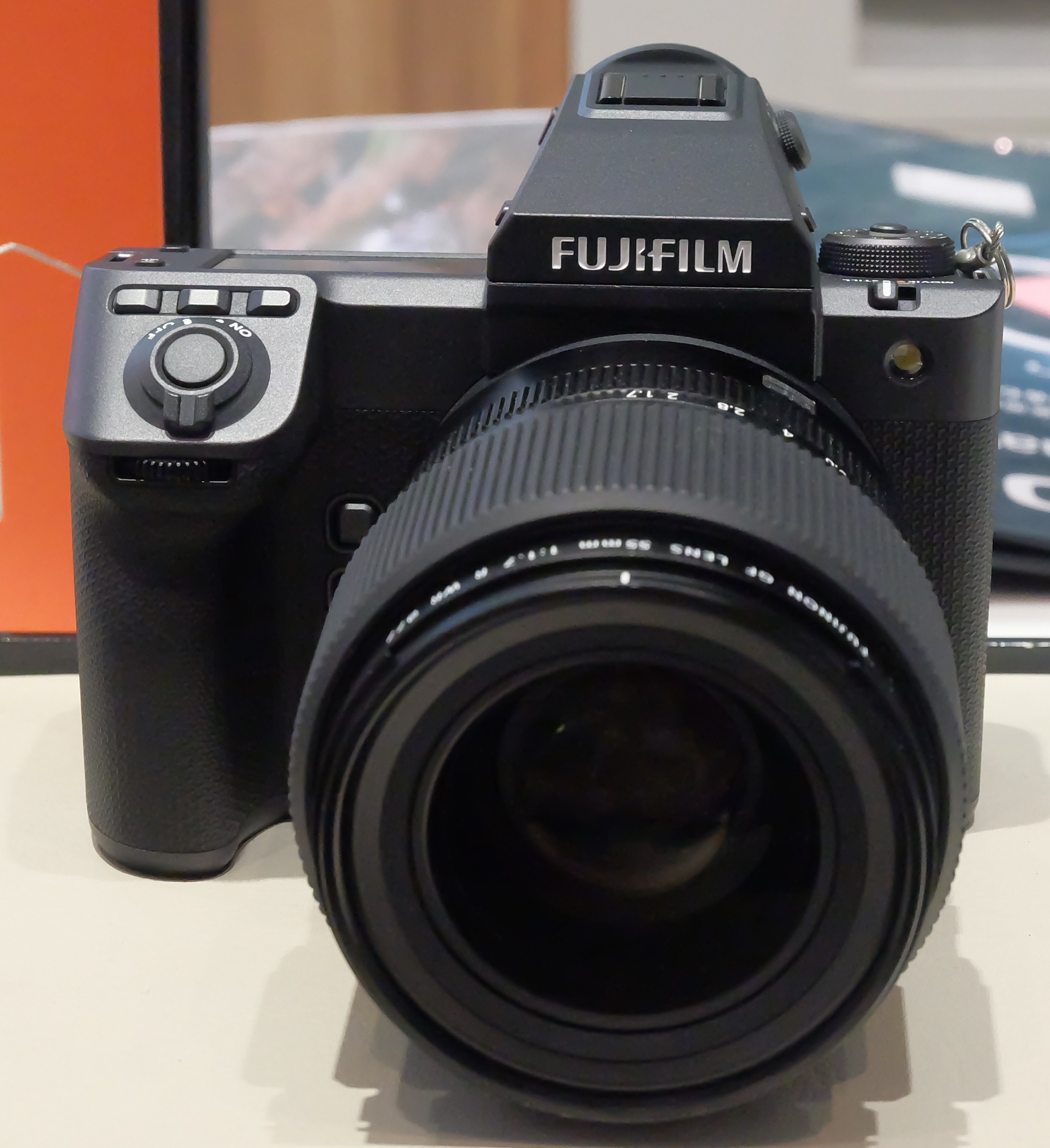

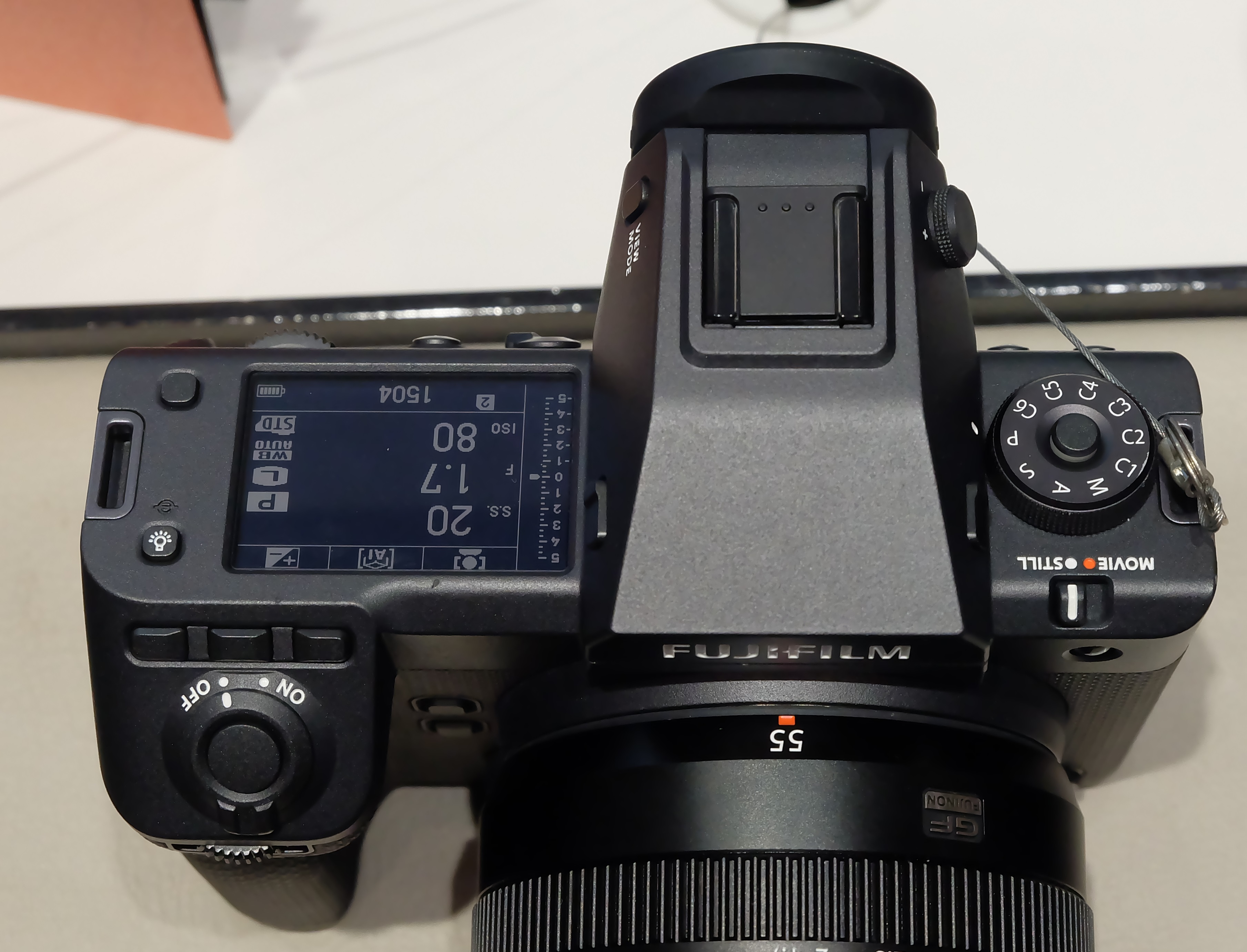

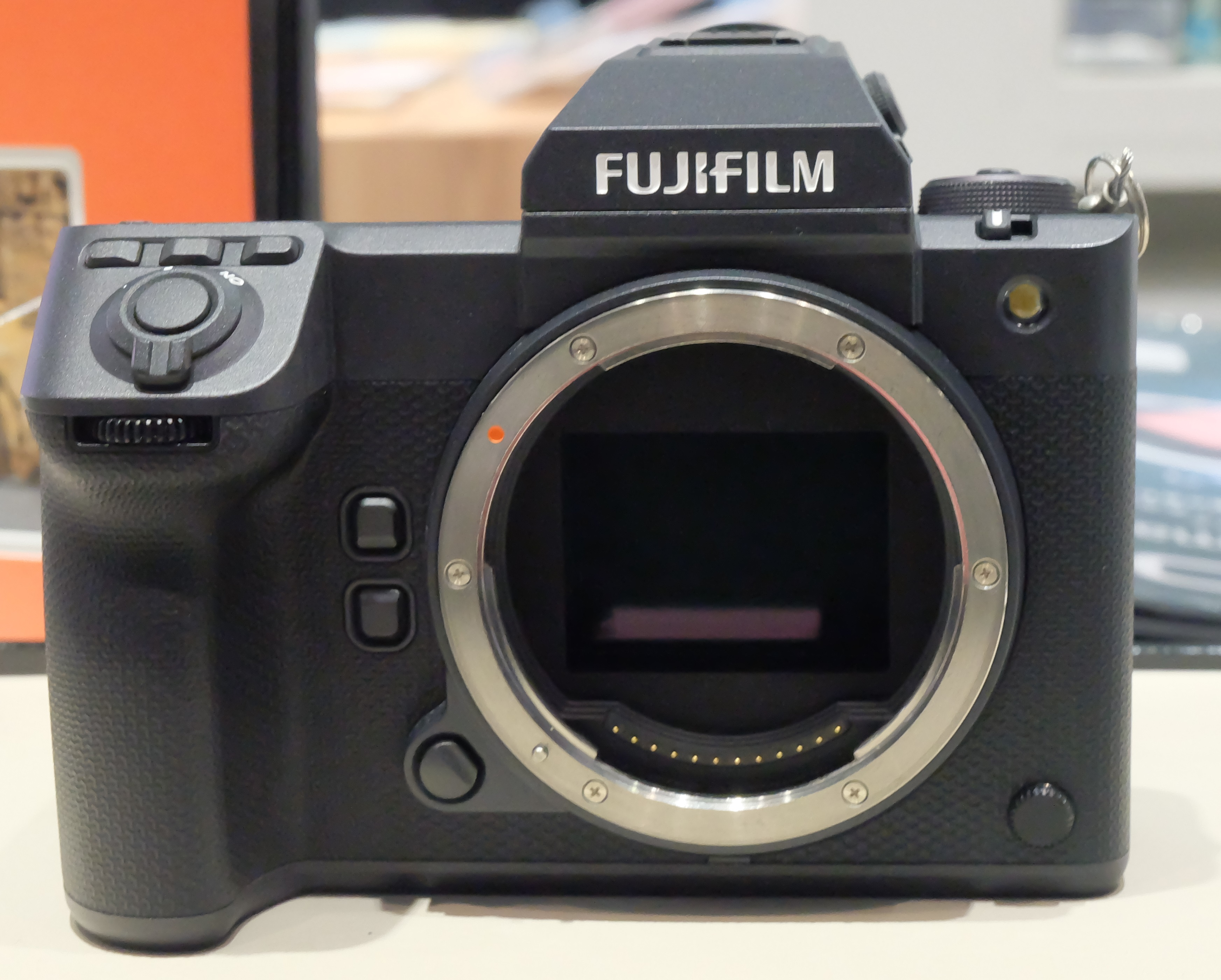

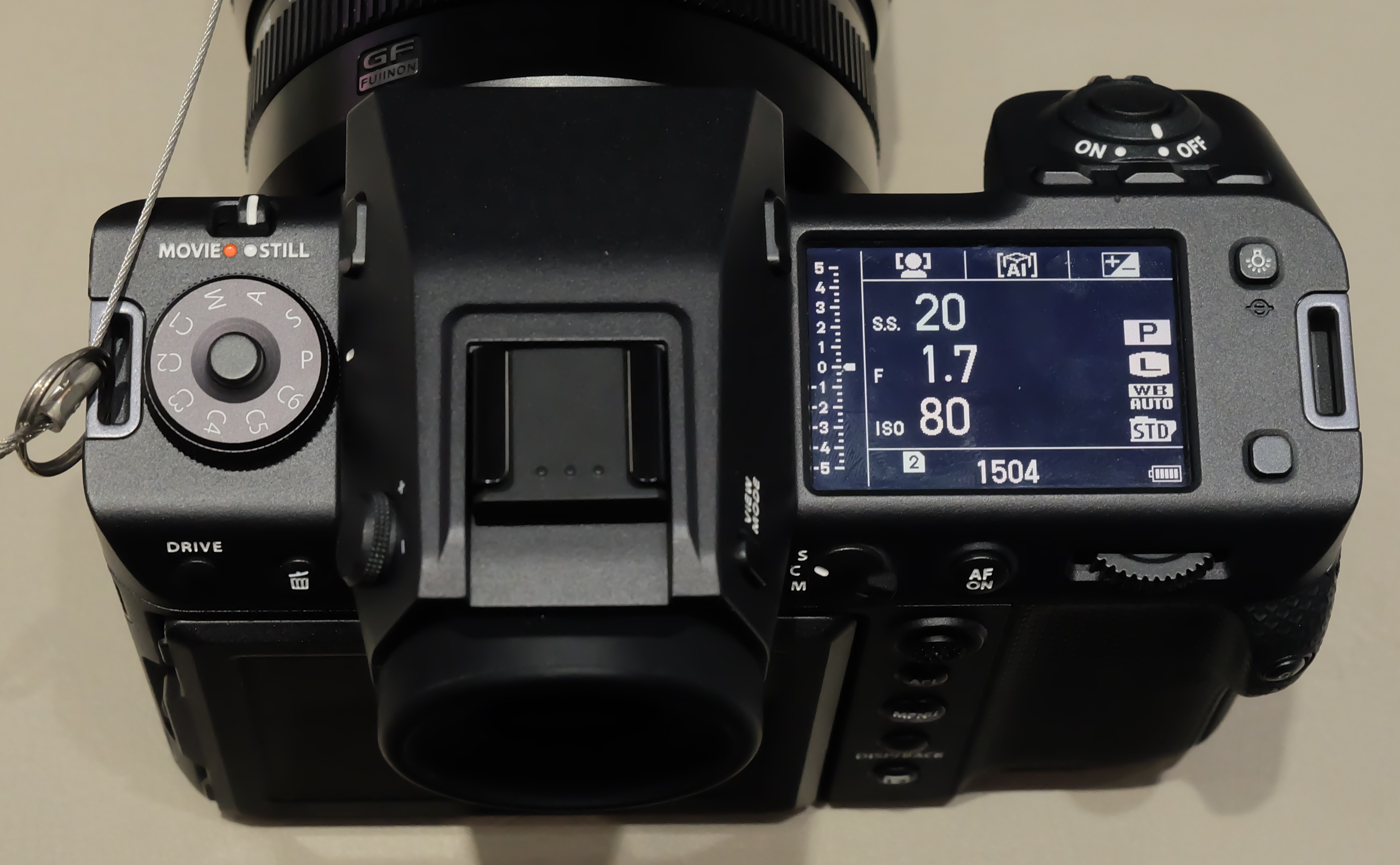

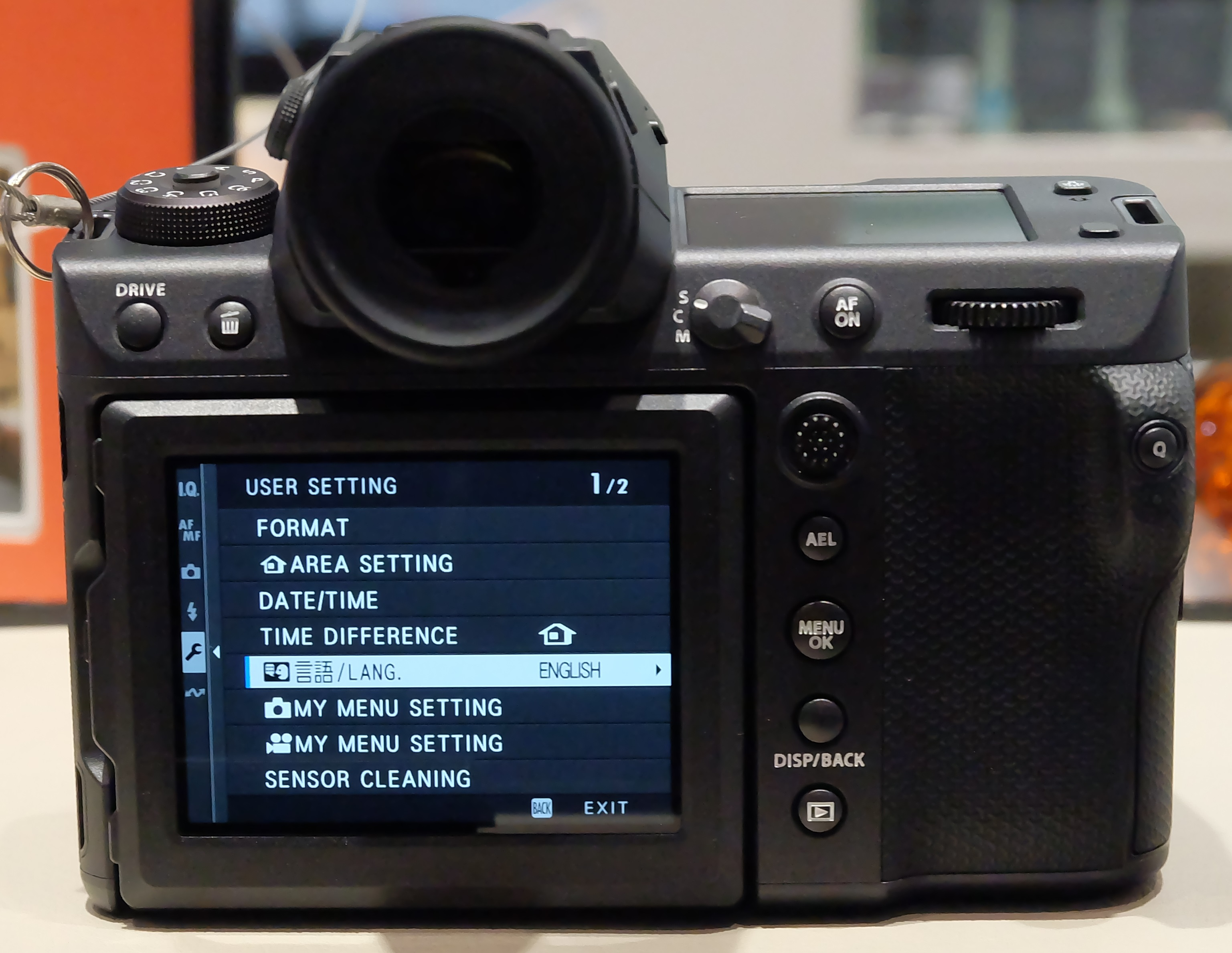

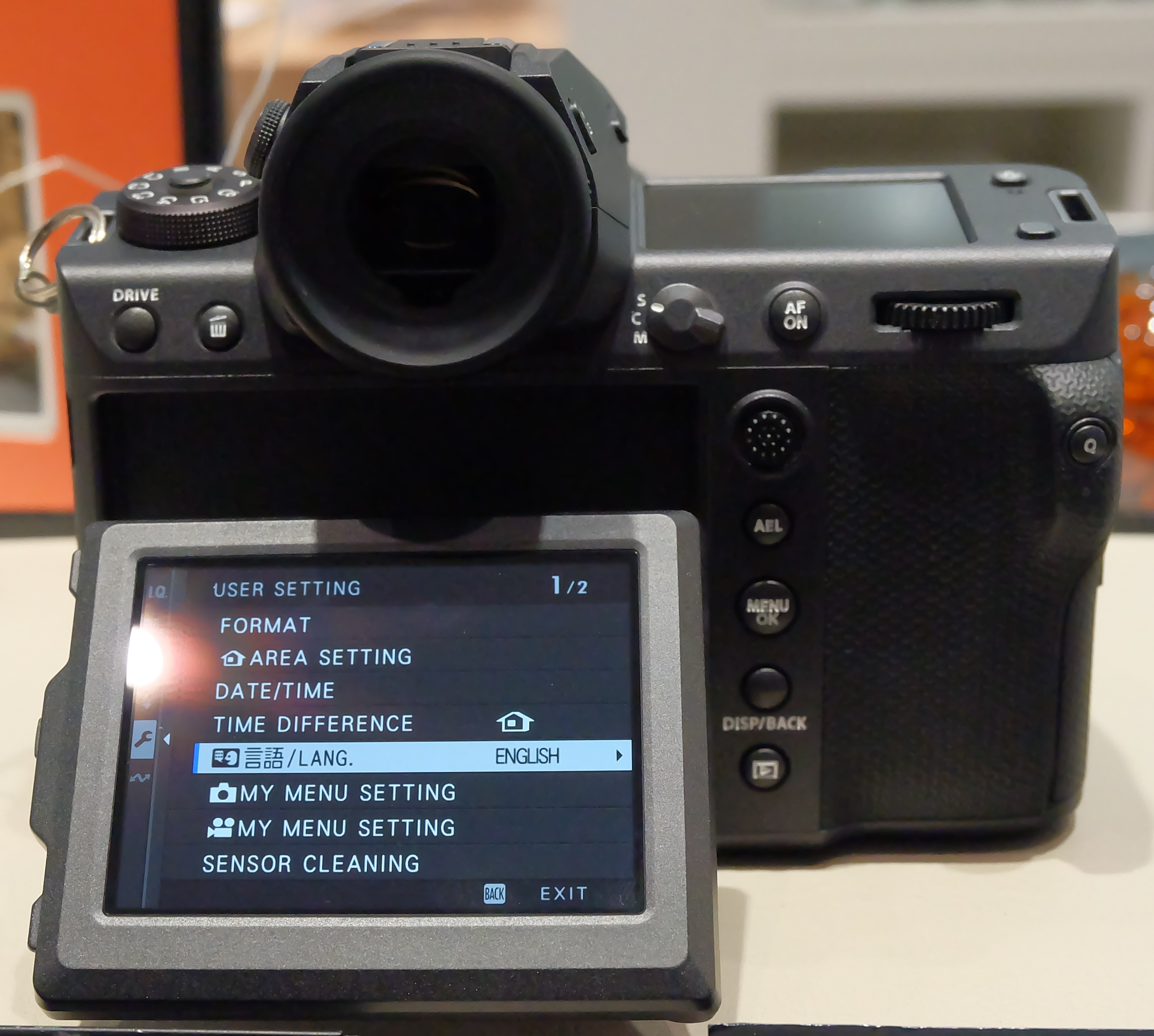

== Notes ==
Type	Lens	2011	2012	2013	2014	2015	2016	2017	2018	2019	2020	2021	2022	2023	2024	2025	2026
MILC	G-mount; Medium format sensor							GFX 50S ^{F} ^{T}					GFX 50S II ^{F} ^{T}				
MILC	G-mount; Medium format sensor									GFX 50R ^{F} ^{T}							
MILC	G-mount; Medium format sensor										GFX 100 ^{F} ^{T}					GFX 100 II ^{F} ^{T}	
MILC	G-mount; Medium format sensor											GFX 100 IR ^{F} ^{T}					
MILC	G-mount; Medium format sensor											GFX 100S ^{F} ^{T}				GFX 100S II ^{F} ^{T}	
MILC	G-mount; Medium format sensor															GFX Eterna 55 ^{F} ^{T}	
MILC	Prime lens Medium format sensor															GFX 100RF ^{F} ^{T}	
MILC	X-mount; APS-C sensor		X-Pro1				X-Pro2				X-Pro3 ^{f} ^{T}						
MILC	X-mount; APS-C sensor								X-H1 ^{F} ^{T}					X-H2 ^{A} ^{T}			
MILC	X-mount; APS-C sensor													X-H2S ^{A} ^{T}			
MILC	X-mount; APS-C sensor											X-S10 ^{A} ^{T}			X-S20 ^{A} ^{T}		
MILC	X-mount; APS-C sensor				X-T1 ^{f}			X-T2 ^{F}		X-T3 ^{F} ^{T}		X-T4 ^{A} ^{T}		X-T5 ^{F} ^{T}			
MILC	X-mount; APS-C sensor															X-T50 ^{f} ^{T}	
MILC	X-mount; APS-C sensor						X-T10 ^{f}	X-T20 ^{f} ^{T}		X-T30 ^{f} ^{T}			X-T30 II ^{f} ^{T}			X-T30 III ^{f} ^{T}	
MILC	X-mount; APS-C sensor									_{15} X-T100 ^{F} ^{T}	X-T200 ^{A} ^{T}						
MILC	X-mount; APS-C sensor			X-E1	X-E2		X-E2s		X-E3 ^{T}			X-E4 ^{f} ^{T}				X-E5 ^{f} ^{T}	
MILC	X-mount; APS-C sensor				X-M1 ^{f}											X-M5 ^{A} ^{T}	
MILC	X-mount; APS-C sensor				X-A1 ^{f}	X-A2 ^{f}		X-A3 ^{f} ^{T}	_{15} X-A5 ^{f} ^{T}		X-A7 ^{A} ^{T}						
MILC	X-mount; APS-C sensor							X-A10 ^{f}	X-A20 ^{f} ^{T}								
Compact	Prime lens APS-C sensor	X100		X100S		X100T		X100F			X100V ^{f} ^{T}				X100VI ^{f} ^{T}		
Compact	Prime lens APS-C sensor						X70 ^{f} ^{T}			XF10 ^{T}							
Compact	Prime lens 1" sensor															X half ^{T}	
Compact	Zoom lens^{2}/_{3}" sensor		X10	X20		X30 ^{f}											
Compact	Zoom lens^{2}/_{3}" sensor				XQ1	XQ2											
Compact	Zoom lens^{2}/_{3}" sensor			XF1													
Bridge	^{2}/_{3}" sensor		X-S1 ^{f}														
Type	Lens																
Type	Lens	2011	2012	2013	2014	2015	2016	2017	2018	2019	2020	2021	2022	2023	2024	2025	2026
