= Fujifilm GFX100S =

2021 medium-format mirrorless camera

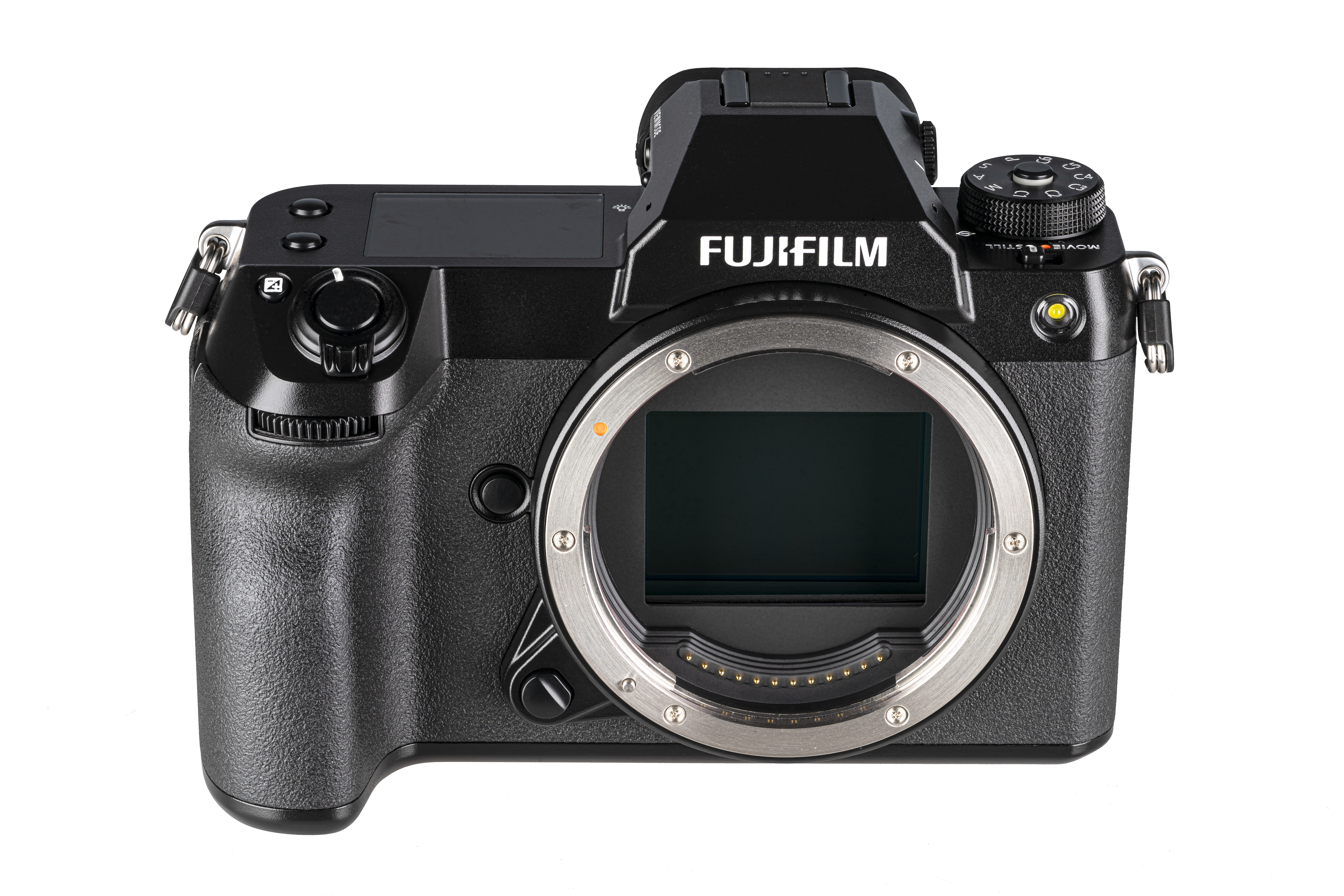

Overview
- Maker: Fujifilm
- Type: Mirrorless Camera
- Production: February 25, 2021–2024
- Intro price: USD 6,000(body)

Lens
- Lens mount: Fujifilm G
- Lens: Interchangeable lens

Sensor/medium
- Sensor type: CMOS with Bayer filter
- Sensor size: 43.8 mm x 32.9 mm (Medium format)
- Sensor maker: Sony
- Maximum resolution: 11648 x 8736 (102 megapixels)
- Film speed: 100–12800 (standard); 50–102400 (extend)
- Storage media: SD, SDHC, SDXC; V90, UHS-II, UHS-I

Focusing
- Focus: Intelligent Hybrid TTL contrast detection / Phase detection
- Focus modes: Single point, Zone, Wide/Tracking
- Focus areas: 117 focus point

Exposure/metering
- Exposure: TTL 256-zones metering
- Exposure modes: Program, Aperture Priority, Shutter Speed Priority, Manual Exposure
- Metering modes: Multi, Spot, Average

Flash
- Flash: External Flash
- Flash synchronization: 1/125 s
- Flash bracketing: ±1/3EV / ±2/3EV / ±1EV
- Compatible flashes: Dedicated TTL Flash compatible

Shutter
- Shutter: Focal Plane Shutter
- Shutter speeds: 4s (P) 30s (A) to 1/4000 s (mechanical), 4s (P) 30s (A) to 1/16000 s (electronic), max. 60min BULB
- Continuous shooting: 5 frames per second

Viewfinder
- Viewfinder: 0.5 inches 3.69M dots OLED
- Viewfinder magnification: 0.77
- Frame coverage: 100%

Image processing
- Image processor: X-Processor 4
- White balance: Auto, Custom, Preset, Fine, Shade, Fluorescent, Incandescent, Underwater
- WB bracketing: ±1 / ±2 / ±3
- Dynamic range bracketing: 100% / 200% / 400%

General
- Video recording: MP4 / MOV; 4K up to 30 fps, 1080p up to 60 fps
- LCD screen: 3.2 inches 2.36M dots Tilt touchscreen
- Battery: NP-W235 Li-ion
- AV port(s): 3.5 mm, 2.5 mm audio jack, HDMI D
- Data port(s): USB-C 3.2, Wi-Fi 4, Bluetooth 4.2
- Body features: In-Body Image Stabilization, Ultra Sonic Vibration Sensor Cleaning system
- Dimensions: 150.0 mm × 104.2 mm × 87.2 mm (5.91 in × 4.10 in × 3.43 in)
- Weight: 900 g (32 oz) (2.0 lb) including battery and memory card
- Made in: Japan

Chronology
- Successor: Fujifilm GFX100S II

The Fujifilm GFX100S is a mirrorless medium format camera produced by Fujifilm with Fujifilm G-mount. It is a smaller version of the 2019 GFX100 camera. The camera was announced by the corporation on January 27, 2021 at the X Summit Global 2021 together with the X-E4. Sales began in March 2021. Production was discontinued soon after the mark II version of the camera was released in 2024.

The camera uses a 102MP 43.8 x 32.9 mm medium format sensor with 100% phase-detection autofocus coverage. It also has a Pixel Shift Multi-Shot capability, allowing the camera to move its sensor to create ultra-high resolution 400MP images. The GFX100S uses a smaller and lighter in-body image stabilization (IBIS) mechanism with 5-axis stabilization than its predecessor GFX100. It is capable of recording 4K video using the full sensor and can also transfer raw video to an external recorder.

Compared to the GFX100, the GFX100S is 500 g lighter, 30 percent smaller, with no interchangeable EVF, and no option for a vertical battery grip. The controls feature a traditional DSLR-style dial, as well as a 1.8 inch monochrome top display which can display various settings.

The camera weighs around 900 g and is built around a magnesium-alloy casing. The manufacturer claims enhanced dust and weather-resistant capabilities and the camera is fully operative at temperatures as low as -10 °C.

A series of native lenses manufactured for the Fujifilm G-Mount by the Fujifilm company bear the official designation 'Fujinon GF' on the side of the lens barrel. Some authors abbreviate this to 'Fujinon G' or simply 'Fujinon'. A comprehensive table with a wide range of parameters for both native Fujinon GF lenses and G-mount-compatible lenses by other manufacturers is maintained here: Fujifilm G-mount (scroll to display table).

== See also ==
- Fujifilm GFX100
- Fujifilm G-mount

Type	Lens	2011	2012	2013	2014	2015	2016	2017	2018	2019	2020	2021	2022	2023	2024	2025
MILC	G-mount; Medium format sensor							GFX 50S ^{F} ^{T}					GFX 50S II ^{F} ^{T}			
MILC	G-mount; Medium format sensor									GFX 50R ^{F} ^{T}						
MILC	G-mount; Medium format sensor										GFX 100 ^{F} ^{T}					GFX 100 II ^{F} ^{T}
MILC	G-mount; Medium format sensor											GFX 100 IR ^{F} ^{T}				
MILC	G-mount; Medium format sensor											GFX 100S ^{F} ^{T}				GFX 100S II^{F} ^{T}
MILC	G-mount; Medium format sensor															GFX Eterna 55^{F} ^{T}
MILC	Prime lens Medium format sensor															GFX 100RF ^{F} ^{T}
MILC	X-mount; APS-C sensor		X-Pro1				X-Pro2				X-Pro3 ^{f} ^{T}					
MILC	X-mount; APS-C sensor								X-H1 ^{F} ^{T}					X-H2 ^{A} ^{T}		
MILC	X-mount; APS-C sensor													X-H2S ^{A} ^{T}		
MILC	X-mount; APS-C sensor											X-S10 ^{A} ^{T}			X-S20 ^{A} ^{T}	
MILC	X-mount; APS-C sensor				X-T1 ^{f}			X-T2 ^{F}		X-T3 ^{F} ^{T}		X-T4 ^{A} ^{T}		X-T5 ^{F} ^{T}		
MILC	X-mount; APS-C sensor						X-T10 ^{f}	X-T20 ^{f} ^{T}		X-T30 ^{f} ^{T}			X-T30 II ^{f} ^{T}			X-T50 ^{f} ^{T}
MILC	X-mount; APS-C sensor									_{15} X-T100 ^{F} ^{T}	X-T200 ^{A} ^{T}					X-T30 III ^{f} ^{T}
MILC	X-mount; APS-C sensor			X-E1	X-E2		X-E2s		X-E3 ^{T}			X-E4 ^{f} ^{T}				X-E5 ^{f} ^{T}
MILC	X-mount; APS-C sensor				X-M1 ^{f}											X-M5 ^{A} ^{T}
MILC	X-mount; APS-C sensor				X-A1 ^{f}	X-A2 ^{f}		X-A3 ^{f} ^{T}	_{15} X-A5 ^{f} ^{T}		X-A7 ^{A} ^{T}					
MILC	X-mount; APS-C sensor							X-A10 ^{f}	X-A20 ^{f} ^{T}							
Compact	Prime lens APS-C sensor	X100		X100S		X100T		X100F			X100V ^{f} ^{T}				X100VI ^{f} ^{T}	
Compact	Prime lens APS-C sensor						X70 ^{f} ^{T}			XF10 ^{T}						
Compact	Prime lens 1" sensor															X half ^{T}
Compact	Zoom lens^{2}/_{3}" sensor		X10	X20		X30 ^{f}										
Compact	Zoom lens^{2}/_{3}" sensor				XQ1	XQ2										
Compact	Zoom lens^{2}/_{3}" sensor			XF1												
Bridge	^{2}/_{3}" sensor		X-S1 ^{f}													
Type	Lens															
Type	Lens	2011	2012	2013	2014	2015	2016	2017	2018	2019	2020	2021	2022	2023	2024	2025
