= Fujifilm GFX100 =

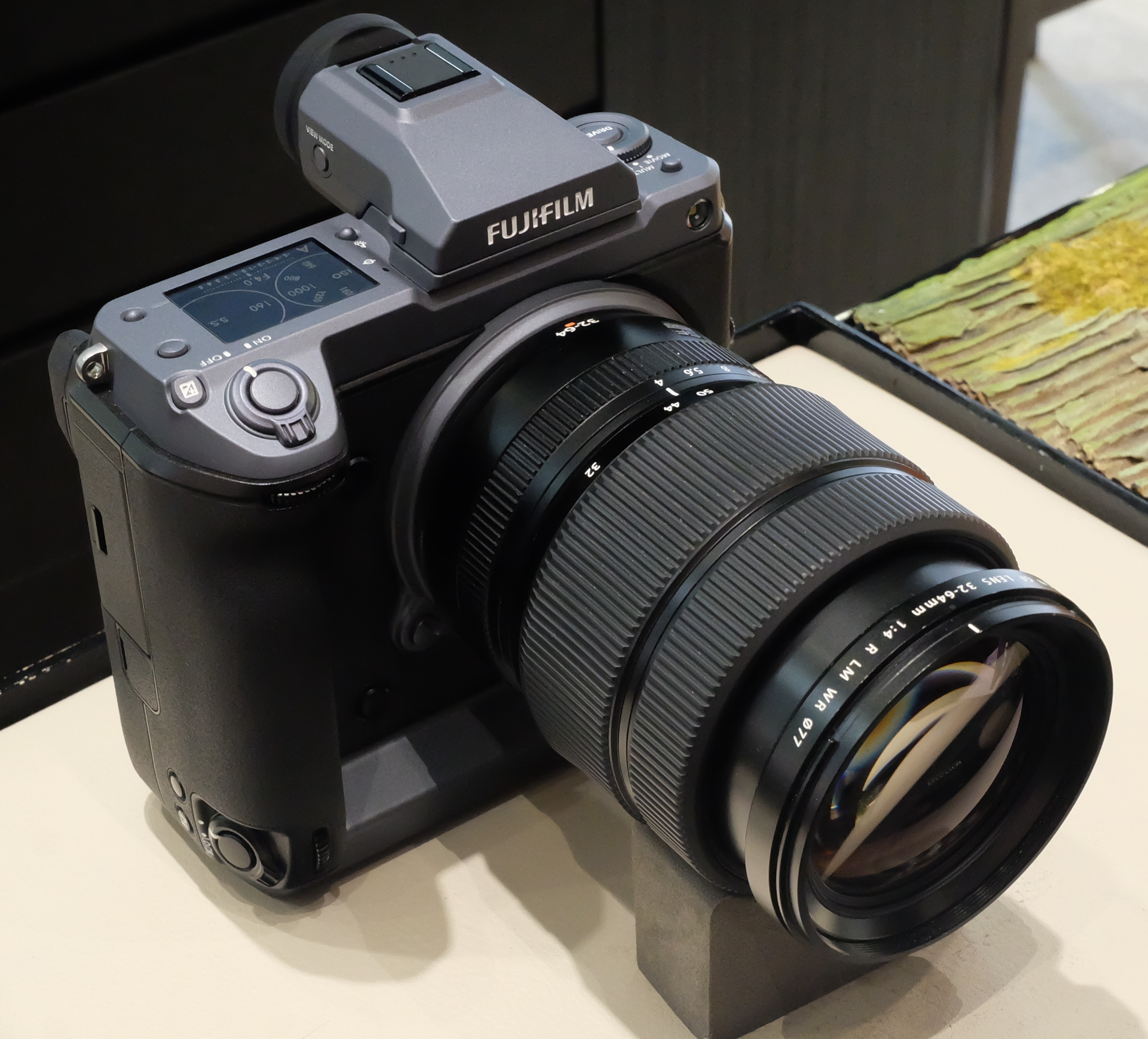
- GFX100 + GF32-64mm f4 R LM WR

Overview
- Maker: Fujifilm
- Type: Mirrorless Camera
- Released: GFX100: June 28, 2019; 6 years ago; GFX100 IR: November 25, 2020; 5 years ago
- Intro price: GFX100: USD 10,000 (body); GFX100 IR: TBA

Lens
- Lens mount: Fujifilm G
- Lens: Interchangeable lens

Sensor/medium
- Sensor type: CMOS with Bayer filter
- Sensor size: 43.8 mm x 32.9 mm; (Medium format)
- Sensor maker: Sony
- Maximum resolution: 11648 x 8736; (102 megapixels)
- Film speed: 100–12800 (standard); 50–102400 (extend)
- Recording medium: SD, SDHC, SDXC; V90, UHS-II, UHS-I
- Storage media: SD card

Focusing
- Focus: Intelligent Hybrid TTL contrast detection / Phase detection
- Focus modes: Single point, Zone, Wide/Tracking
- Focus areas: 425 focus point
- Focus bracketing: 1–999 Frames, 1–10 Steps, 0–10 s Interval

Exposure/metering
- Exposure: TTL 256-zones metering
- Exposure modes: Program, Aperture Priority, Shutter Speed Priority, Manual Exposure
- Metering modes: Multi, Spot, Average

Flash
- Flash: External Flash
- Flash synchronization: 1/125 s
- Flash bracketing: ±1/3EV, ±2/3EV, ±1EV
- Compatible flashes: Dedicated TTL Flash compatible

Shutter
- Shutter: Focal Plane Shutter
- Shutter speeds: 1/4000 s to 60 m (mechanical), 60 m to 1/16000 s (electronic)
- Continuous shooting: 5 frames per second

Viewfinder
- Viewfinder: 0.5 inches 5.76M dots OLED
- Viewfinder magnification: 0.86
- Frame coverage: 100%

Image processing
- Image processor: X-Processor 4
- White balance: Auto, Custom, Preset, Fluorescent, Incandescent, Underwater
- WB bracketing: ±1, ±2, ±3
- Dynamic range bracketing: 100%, 200%, 400%

General
- Video recording: MP4 / MOV; DCI4K up to 30 fps; 4K up to 30 fps; 1080p up to 60 fps
- LCD screen: 3.2 inches 2.36M dots; Tilt touchscreen
- Battery: NP-T125 Li-ion
- AV port(s): 3.5 mm, 2.5 mm audio jack, HDMI D
- Data ports: USB-C 3.2, Wi-Fi 5, Bluetooth 4.2
- Body features: In-Body Image Stabilization, Ultra Sonic Vibration Sensor Cleaning system
- Dimensions: 156.2 mm × 163.6 mm × 102.9 mm (6.15 in × 6.44 in × 4.05 in)
- Weight: 1,320 g (2.91 lb); including battery and memory card
- Made in: Japan

Chronology
- Successor: Fujifilm GFX100 II

The Fujifilm GFX100 is a mirrorless medium-format camera produced by Fujifilm. It is the flagship model of the GFX Series of mirrorless digital cameras and the third camera with the Fujifilm G-mount. The camera comes in two versions, the regular GFX100 and the GFX100 IR.

The GFX100 won the Japanese 2020 Camera Grand Prix Editors Award.

== GFX100 ==
On September 25, 2018, the GFX 100Megapixels Concept was unveiled at Photokina 2018. The camera was launched on May 23, 2019, for release in late June 2019.

The camera has a back-illuminated sensor with phase detection pixels. The sensor is 1.7 times the size of a 35 mm full-frame sensor. The camera uses the in-body image stabilization (IBIS) mechanism with 5-axis stabilization, and has 4K/30P video recording capability using the full sensor without cropping. It has twin battery packs, dual SD slots, twin status LCDs, a tri-axial 3.2" monitor, USB charging and power delivery over USB C and a removable electronic viewfinder with a 5.76 million dot OLED panel and 0.86× magnification.

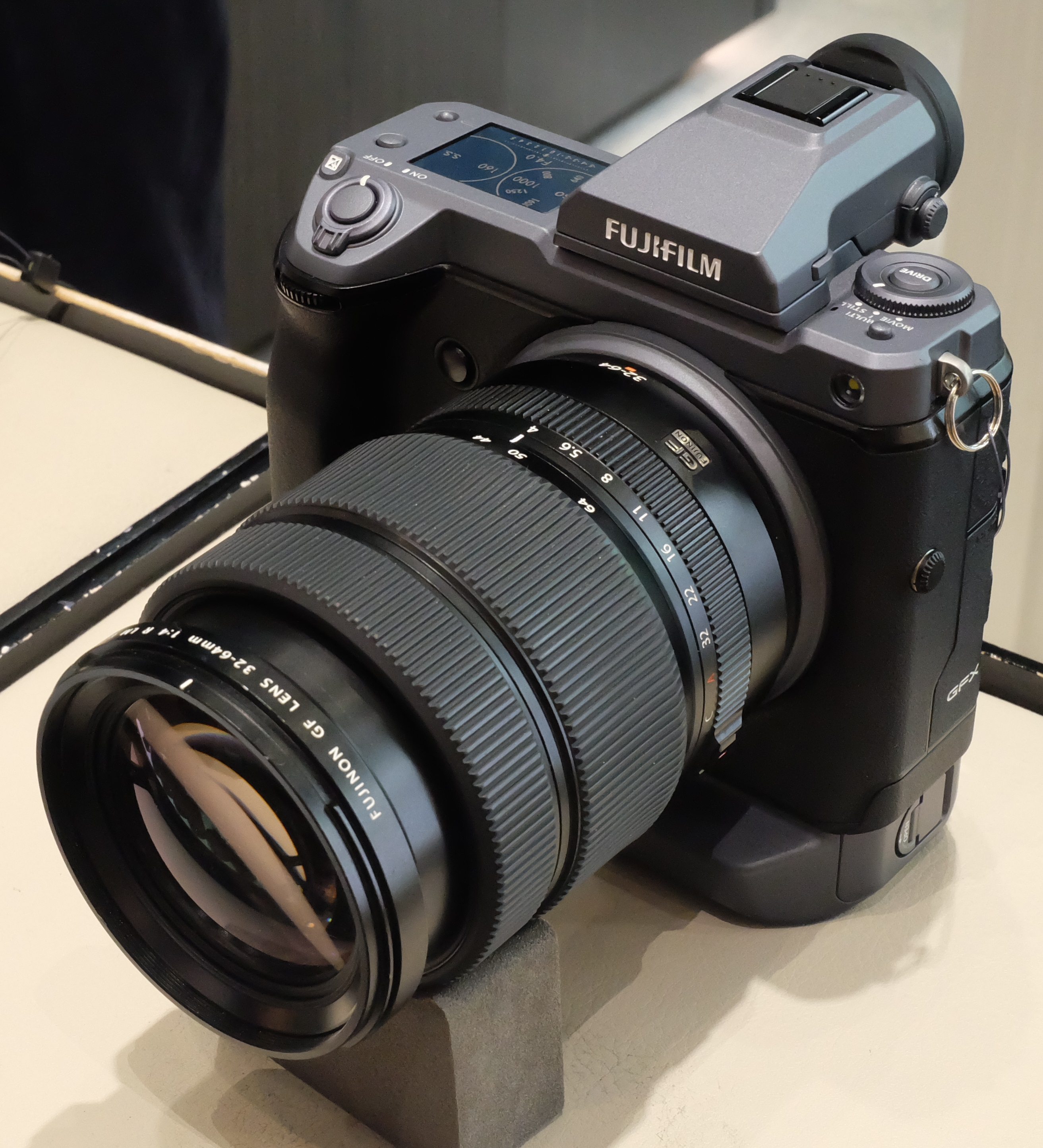

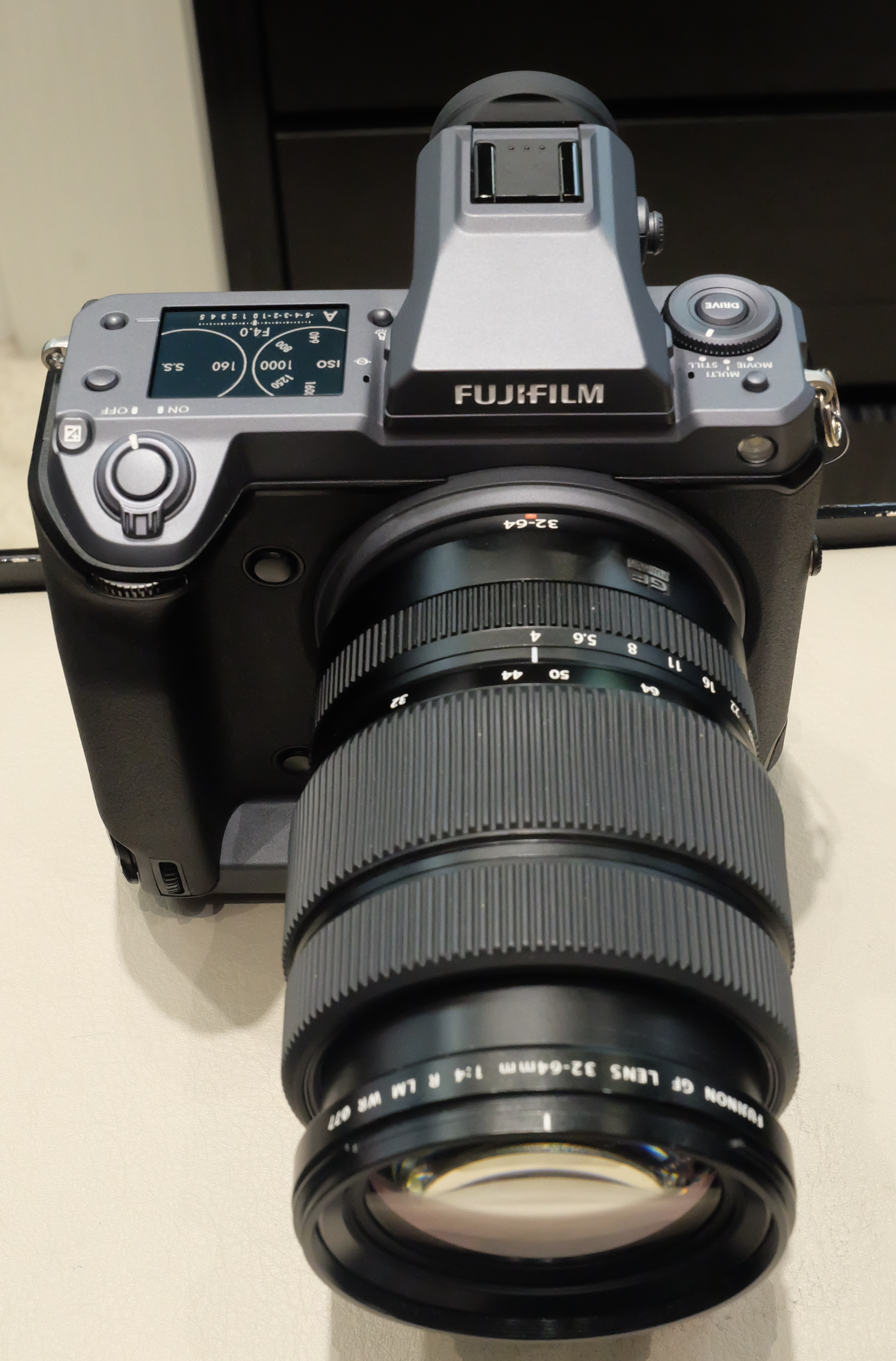

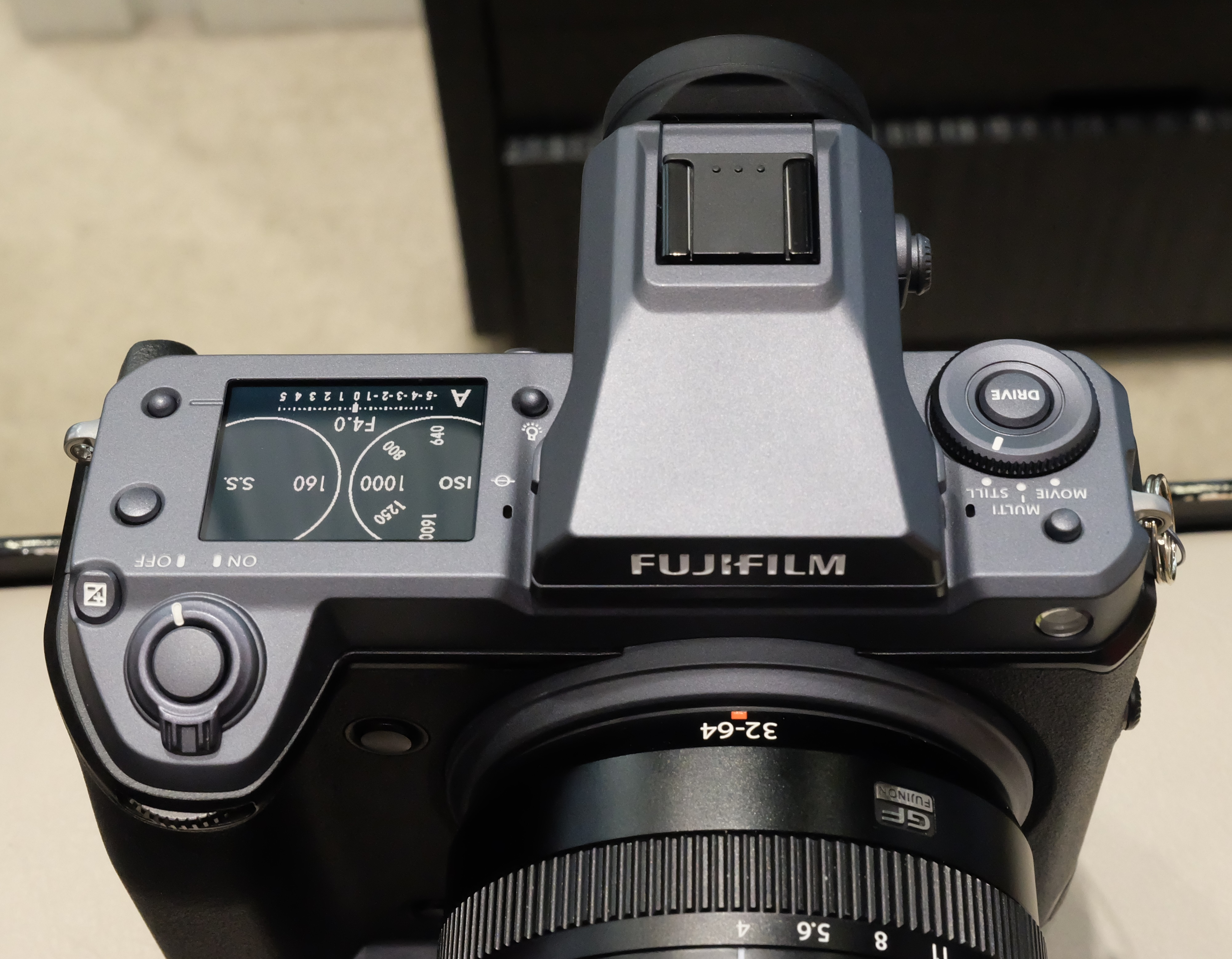

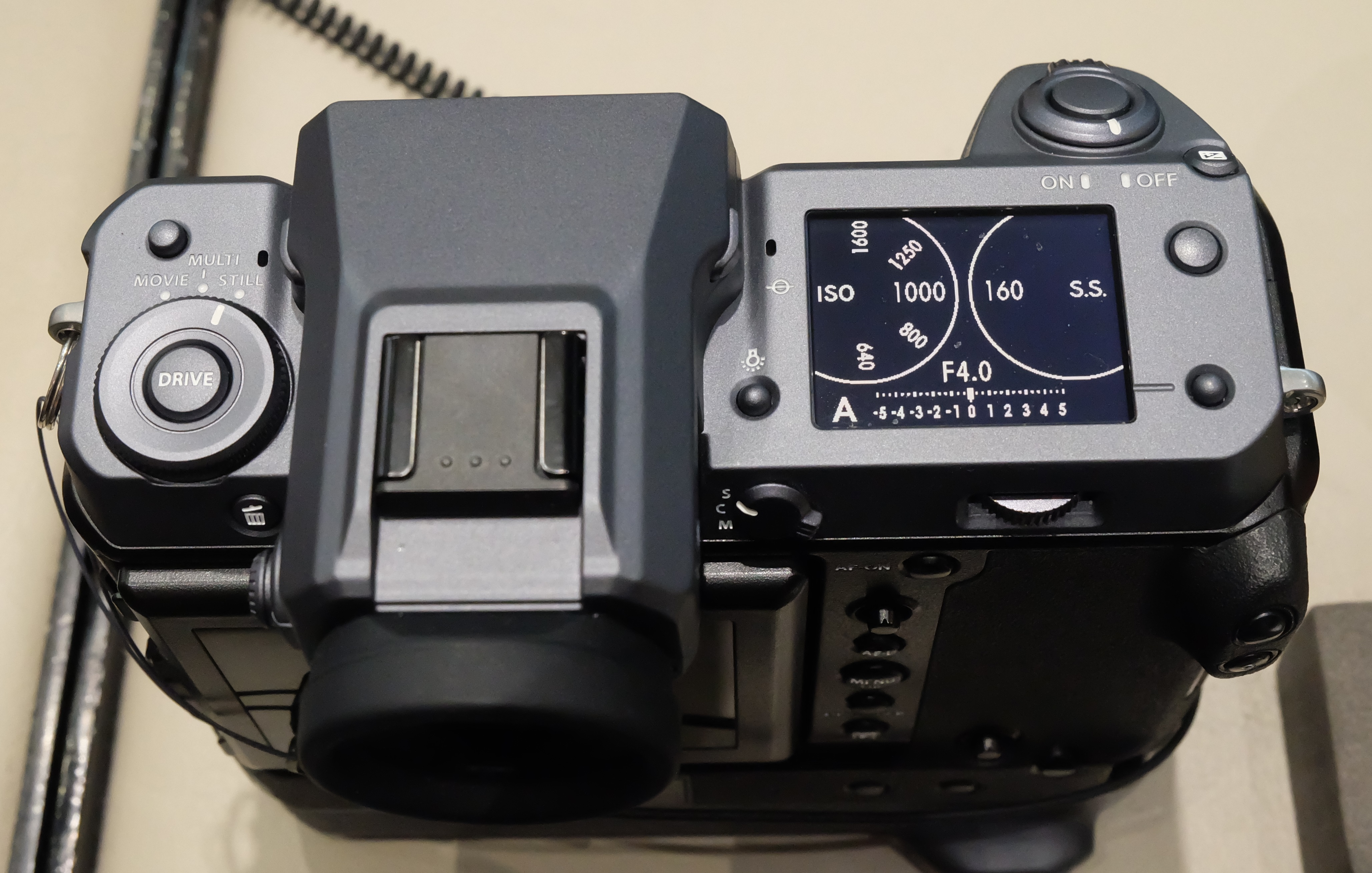

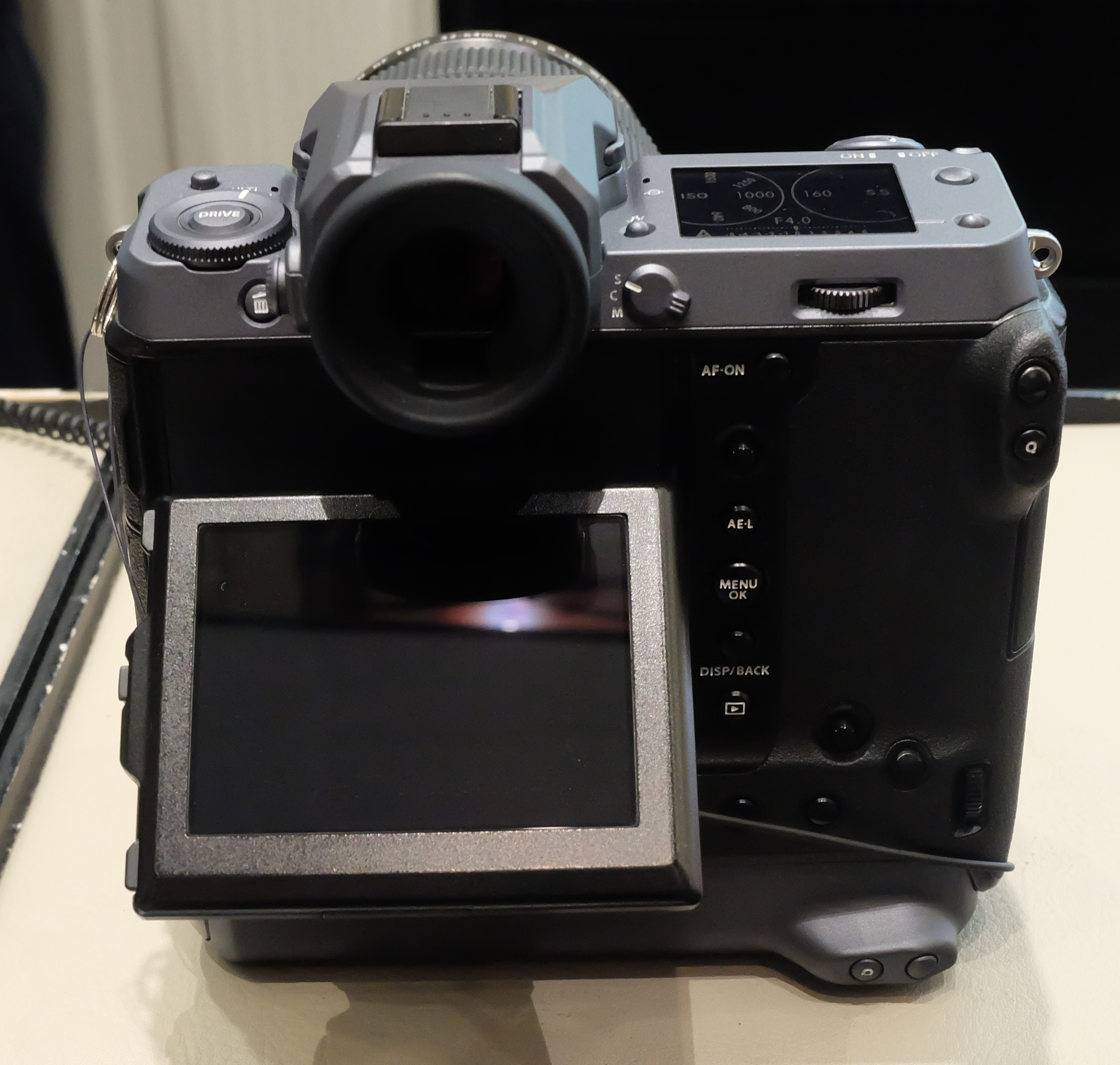

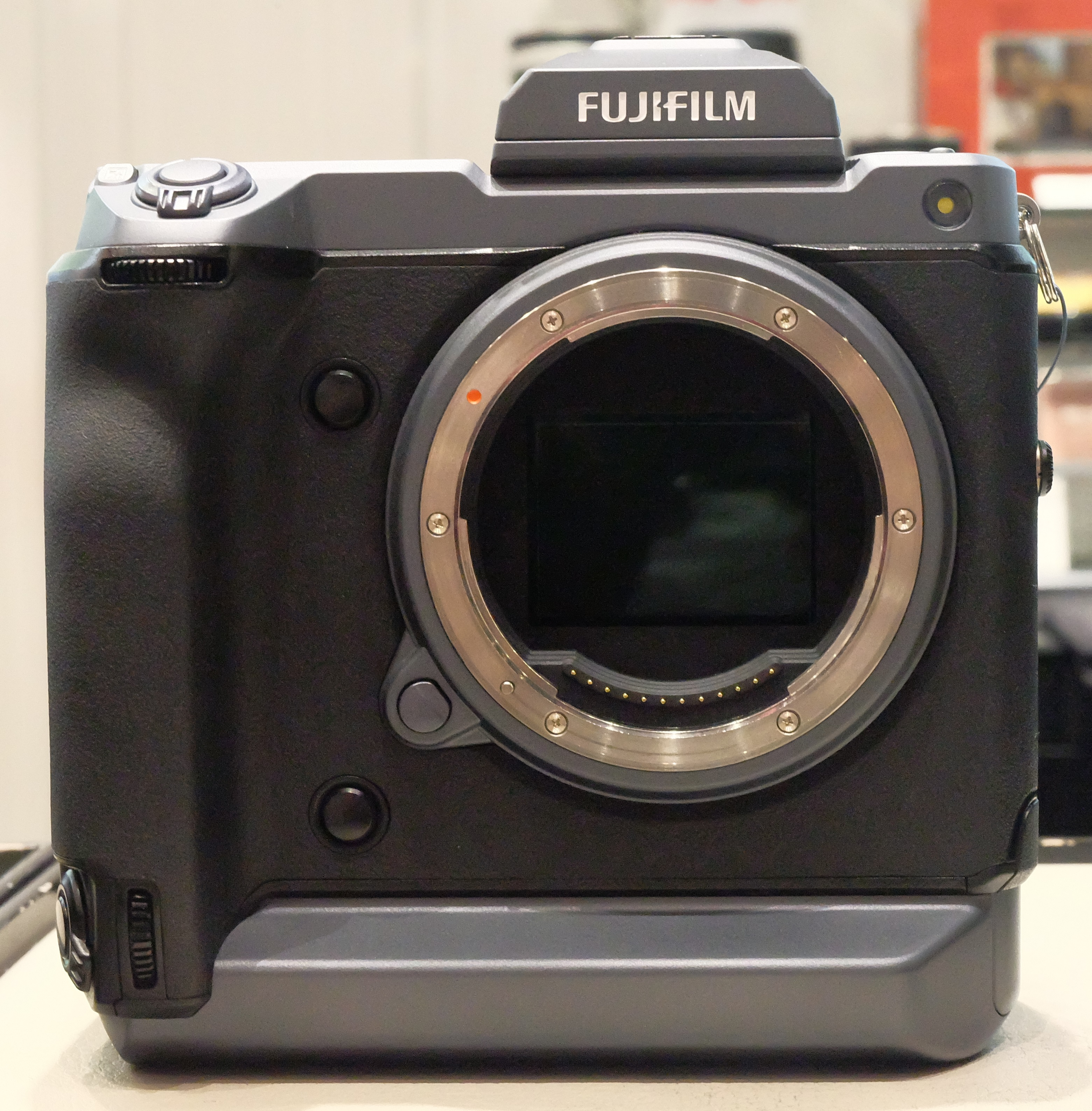

== GFX100 IR ==
On November 25, 2020, Fujifilm launched a special edition of the camera called GFX100 IR.

The camera is primarily used for infrared image capturing up to 400MP resolution of images, courtesy of a new 'Pixel Shift Combiner' feature.

The camera however, is not for general photographers. It is designed for forensic, scientific, and cultural preservation applications, and therefore, will not be available to consumers for personal use. The new camera will start selling on a special order in 2021.

== GFX100RF ==
On March 20th 2025, Fujifilm announced a fixed-lens camera in the style of a rangefinder, much like the Fujifilm x100 series. The GFX100RF features a 102 megapixel 44 x 33 mm sensor paired with a 35mm (28mm full-frame equivalent) F4 lens, and a dedicated aspect ratio control dial.

== See also ==
- Fujifilm GFX100S
- Fujifilm G-mount

Type	Lens	2011	2012	2013	2014	2015	2016	2017	2018	2019	2020	2021	2022	2023	2024	2025
MILC	G-mount; Medium format sensor							GFX 50S ^{F} ^{T}					GFX 50S II ^{F} ^{T}			
MILC	G-mount; Medium format sensor									GFX 50R ^{F} ^{T}						
MILC	G-mount; Medium format sensor										GFX 100 ^{F} ^{T}					GFX 100 II ^{F} ^{T}
MILC	G-mount; Medium format sensor											GFX 100 IR ^{F} ^{T}				
MILC	G-mount; Medium format sensor											GFX 100S ^{F} ^{T}				GFX 100S II^{F} ^{T}
MILC	G-mount; Medium format sensor															GFX Eterna 55^{F} ^{T}
MILC	Prime lens Medium format sensor															GFX 100RF ^{F} ^{T}
MILC	X-mount; APS-C sensor		X-Pro1				X-Pro2				X-Pro3 ^{f} ^{T}					
MILC	X-mount; APS-C sensor								X-H1 ^{F} ^{T}					X-H2 ^{A} ^{T}		
MILC	X-mount; APS-C sensor													X-H2S ^{A} ^{T}		
MILC	X-mount; APS-C sensor											X-S10 ^{A} ^{T}			X-S20 ^{A} ^{T}	
MILC	X-mount; APS-C sensor				X-T1 ^{f}			X-T2 ^{F}		X-T3 ^{F} ^{T}		X-T4 ^{A} ^{T}		X-T5 ^{F} ^{T}		
MILC	X-mount; APS-C sensor						X-T10 ^{f}	X-T20 ^{f} ^{T}		X-T30 ^{f} ^{T}			X-T30 II ^{f} ^{T}			X-T50 ^{f} ^{T}
MILC	X-mount; APS-C sensor									_{15} X-T100 ^{F} ^{T}	X-T200 ^{A} ^{T}					X-T30 III ^{f} ^{T}
MILC	X-mount; APS-C sensor			X-E1	X-E2		X-E2s		X-E3 ^{T}			X-E4 ^{f} ^{T}				X-E5 ^{f} ^{T}
MILC	X-mount; APS-C sensor				X-M1 ^{f}											X-M5 ^{A} ^{T}
MILC	X-mount; APS-C sensor				X-A1 ^{f}	X-A2 ^{f}		X-A3 ^{f} ^{T}	_{15} X-A5 ^{f} ^{T}		X-A7 ^{A} ^{T}					
MILC	X-mount; APS-C sensor							X-A10 ^{f}	X-A20 ^{f} ^{T}							
Compact	Prime lens APS-C sensor	X100		X100S		X100T		X100F			X100V ^{f} ^{T}				X100VI ^{f} ^{T}	
Compact	Prime lens APS-C sensor						X70 ^{f} ^{T}			XF10 ^{T}						
Compact	Prime lens 1" sensor															X half ^{T}
Compact	Zoom lens^{2}/_{3}" sensor		X10	X20		X30 ^{f}										
Compact	Zoom lens^{2}/_{3}" sensor				XQ1	XQ2										
Compact	Zoom lens^{2}/_{3}" sensor			XF1												
Bridge	^{2}/_{3}" sensor		X-S1 ^{f}													
Type	Lens															
Type	Lens	2011	2012	2013	2014	2015	2016	2017	2018	2019	2020	2021	2022	2023	2024	2025
