= Fujifilm GFX series =

Series of digital cameras

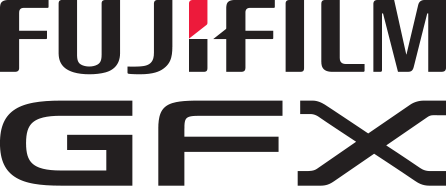
Logo

The Fujifilm GFX series of digital cameras consists of Fujifilm's professional digital cameras aimed at professional photographers. It is part of the larger range of Fujifilm's digital cameras. As of 2024, all GFX cameras use 43.8 × 32.9 mm medium format image sensors with Bayer CFAs.

== Camera models ==
- Fujifilm GFX 50S: The first G-mount camera by Fujifilm and the second mirrorless medium format camera. Announced at Photokina 2016, the camera was available for sale from 28 February 2017.
- Fujifilm GFX 50R: Shares the same image sensor, processor and most components of the larger GFX 50S. Announced on 25 September 2018.
- Fujifilm GFX100: Original flagship model of the GFX series. Unveiled at Photokina in 2018, launched on 23 May 2019, and released in June 2019. Uses the Sony IMX461 sensor.
- Fujifilm GFX100 IR: Infrared variant of the GFX100.
- Fujifilm GFX100S: A physically smaller variant of the GFX100 that retains both its sensor and processor. Unveiled on 27 January 2021.
- Fujifilm GFX50S II: Successor to the original GFX 50S. Announced on 2 September 2021.
- Fujifilm GFX100 II: Successor to the GFX100, the flagship model of the GFX series. Announced on 12 September 2023.
- Fujifilm GFX100S II: Successor to the GFX100S. Announced on 16 May 2024.
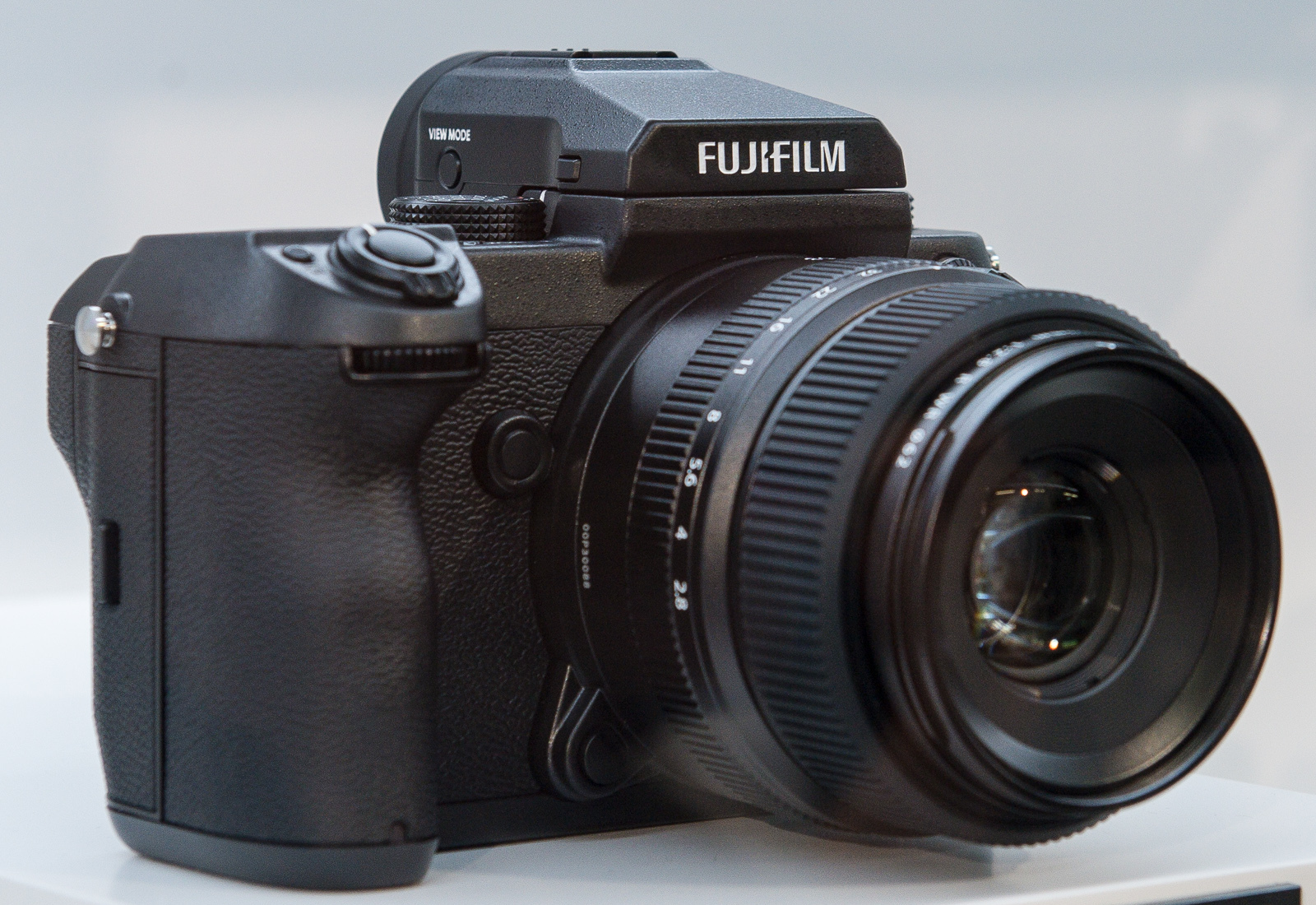
Fujifilm GFX 50S

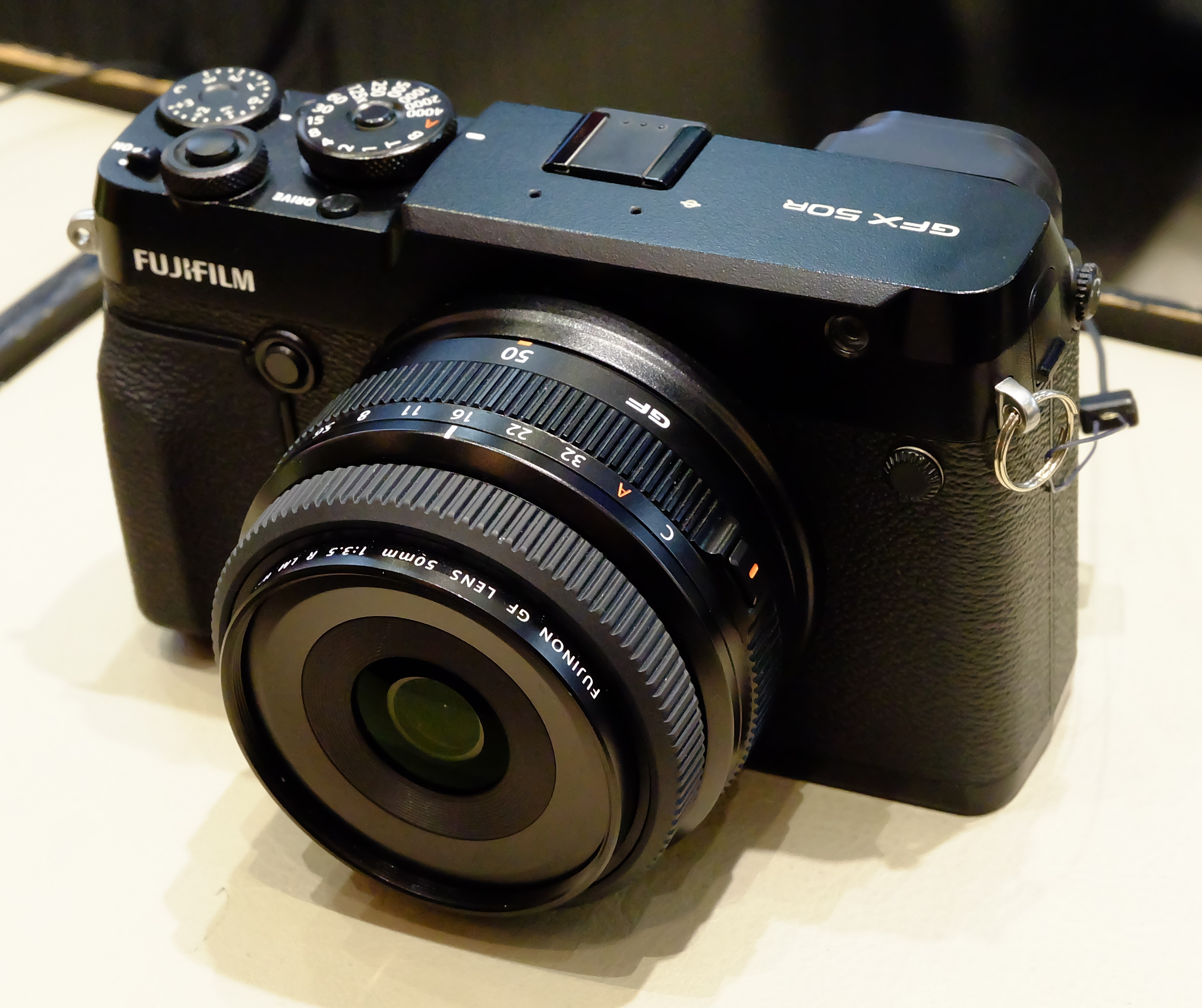
Fujifilm GFX 50R

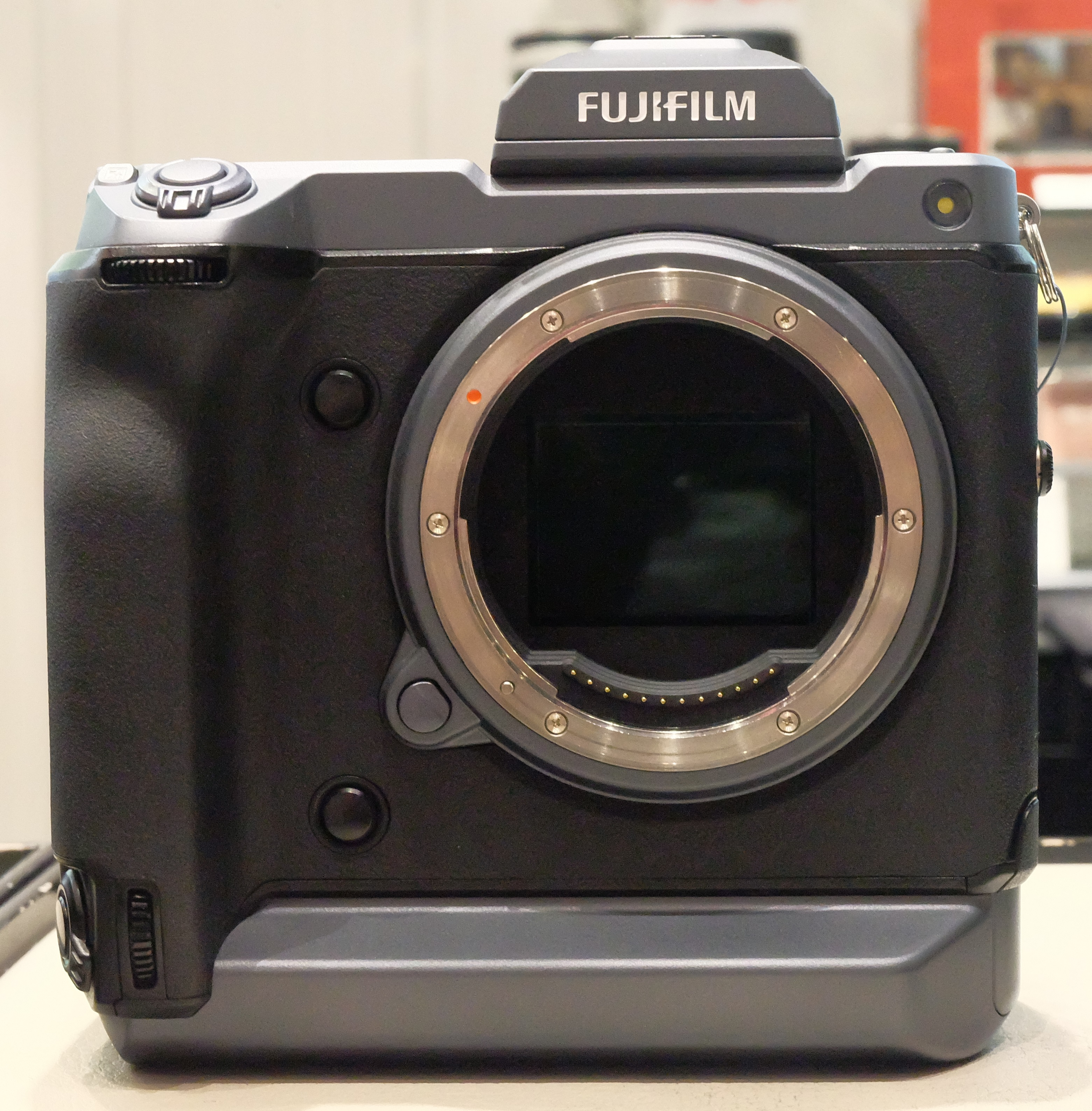
Fujifilm GFX 100

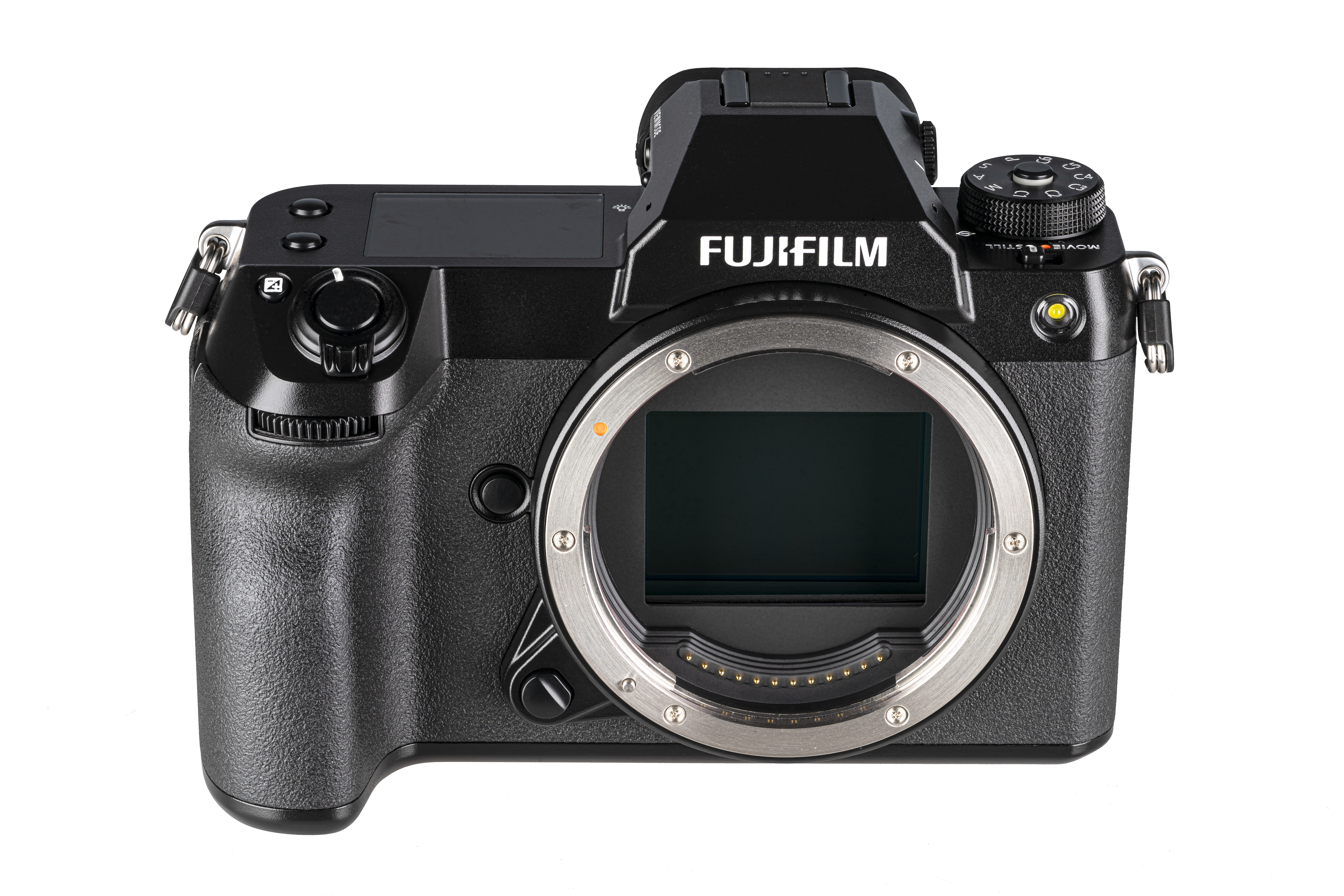
Fujifilm GFX 100S

== GFX camera chronology ==
Sensor Size	Lens Type	2017	2018	2019	2020	2021	2022	2023	2024	2025	2026
Medium Format	MILC										GFX Eterna 55
Medium Format	MILC	GFX50S					GFX50S II				
Medium Format	MILC			GFX50R							
Medium Format	MILC				GFX100				GFX100 II		
Medium Format	MILC					GFX100 IR					
Medium Format	MILC					GFX100S				GFX100S II	

Color filter array: Bayer

== Fuji G-mount lenses ==
All GFX-series cameras with interchangeable lenses use Fujifilm G-mount lenses.

== See also ==
- Fujinon
- Fujifilm G-mount
- Fujifilm X-mount
- Fujifilm X series

Type	Lens	2011	2012	2013	2014	2015	2016	2017	2018	2019	2020	2021	2022	2023	2024	2025	2026
MILC	G-mount; Medium format sensor							GFX 50S ^{F} ^{T}					GFX 50S II ^{F} ^{T}				
MILC	G-mount; Medium format sensor									GFX 50R ^{F} ^{T}							
MILC	G-mount; Medium format sensor										GFX 100 ^{F} ^{T}					GFX 100 II ^{F} ^{T}	
MILC	G-mount; Medium format sensor											GFX 100 IR ^{F} ^{T}					
MILC	G-mount; Medium format sensor											GFX 100S ^{F} ^{T}				GFX 100S II ^{F} ^{T}	
MILC	G-mount; Medium format sensor															GFX Eterna 55 ^{F} ^{T}	
MILC	Prime lens Medium format sensor															GFX 100RF ^{F} ^{T}	
MILC	X-mount; APS-C sensor		X-Pro1				X-Pro2				X-Pro3 ^{f} ^{T}						
MILC	X-mount; APS-C sensor								X-H1 ^{F} ^{T}					X-H2 ^{A} ^{T}			
MILC	X-mount; APS-C sensor													X-H2S ^{A} ^{T}			
MILC	X-mount; APS-C sensor											X-S10 ^{A} ^{T}			X-S20 ^{A} ^{T}		
MILC	X-mount; APS-C sensor				X-T1 ^{f}			X-T2 ^{F}		X-T3 ^{F} ^{T}		X-T4 ^{A} ^{T}		X-T5 ^{F} ^{T}			
MILC	X-mount; APS-C sensor															X-T50 ^{f} ^{T}	
MILC	X-mount; APS-C sensor						X-T10 ^{f}	X-T20 ^{f} ^{T}		X-T30 ^{f} ^{T}			X-T30 II ^{f} ^{T}			X-T30 III ^{f} ^{T}	
MILC	X-mount; APS-C sensor									_{15} X-T100 ^{F} ^{T}	X-T200 ^{A} ^{T}						
MILC	X-mount; APS-C sensor			X-E1	X-E2		X-E2s		X-E3 ^{T}			X-E4 ^{f} ^{T}				X-E5 ^{f} ^{T}	
MILC	X-mount; APS-C sensor				X-M1 ^{f}											X-M5 ^{A} ^{T}	
MILC	X-mount; APS-C sensor				X-A1 ^{f}	X-A2 ^{f}		X-A3 ^{f} ^{T}	_{15} X-A5 ^{f} ^{T}		X-A7 ^{A} ^{T}						
MILC	X-mount; APS-C sensor							X-A10 ^{f}	X-A20 ^{f} ^{T}								
Compact	Prime lens APS-C sensor	X100		X100S		X100T		X100F			X100V ^{f} ^{T}				X100VI ^{f} ^{T}		
Compact	Prime lens APS-C sensor						X70 ^{f} ^{T}			XF10 ^{T}							
Compact	Prime lens 1" sensor															X half ^{T}	
Compact	Zoom lens^{2}/_{3}" sensor		X10	X20		X30 ^{f}											
Compact	Zoom lens^{2}/_{3}" sensor				XQ1	XQ2											
Compact	Zoom lens^{2}/_{3}" sensor			XF1													
Bridge	^{2}/_{3}" sensor		X-S1 ^{f}														
Type	Lens																
Type	Lens	2011	2012	2013	2014	2015	2016	2017	2018	2019	2020	2021	2022	2023	2024	2025	2026
