= GFX =

GFX may refer to:

- Shorthand for Graphics
- Fujifilm GFX series, a line of medium-format digital cameras
- Scaleform GFx, a game development middleware package
