= Fujifilm GFX 50R =

Mirrorless interchangeable-lens camera

Fujifilm GFX-50R
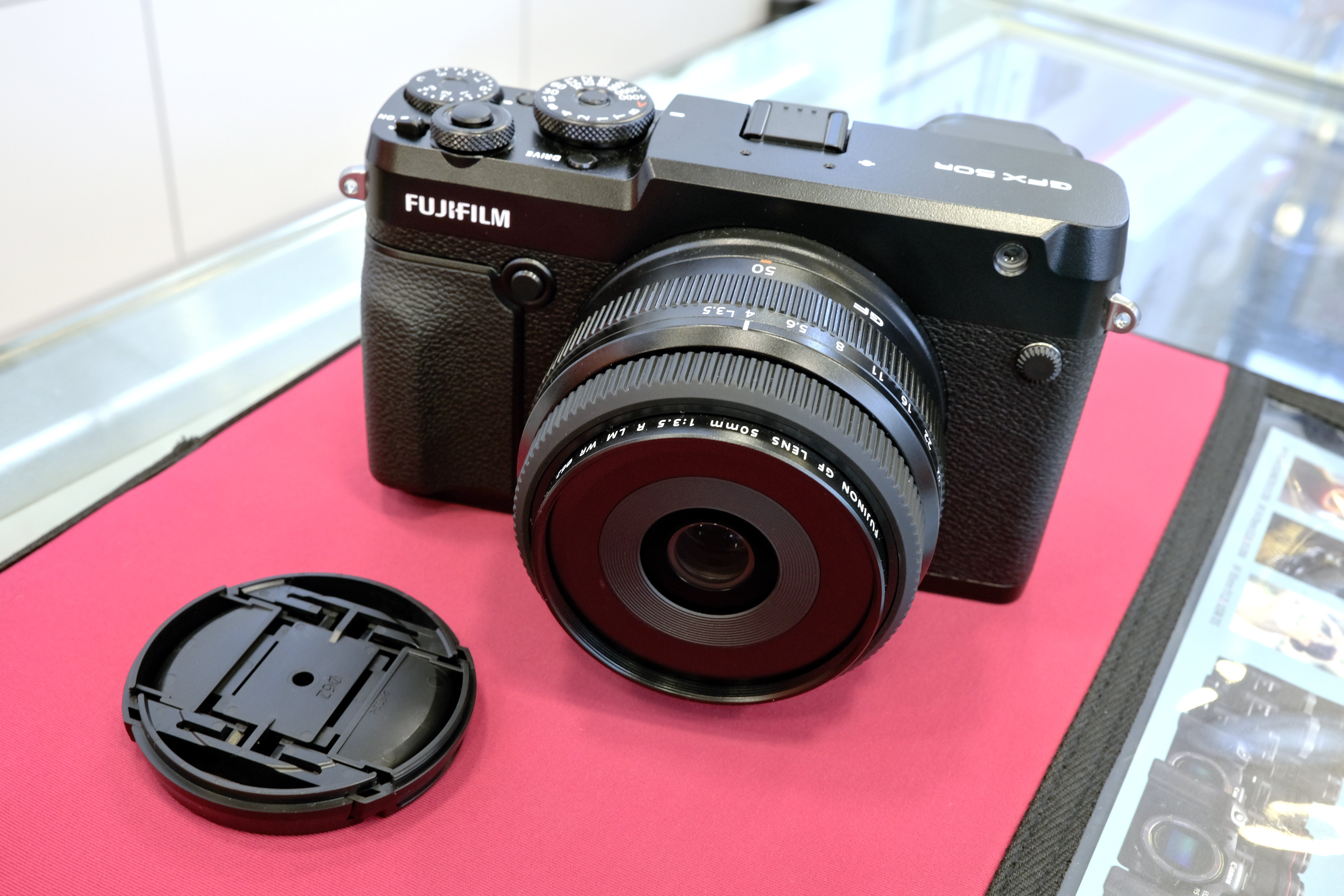

Overview
- Maker: Fujifilm
- Type: MILC
- Released: September 25, 2018; 8 years ago
- Intro price: USD 4500 (body), USD 5500 (kit), USD 6000 (kit)

Lens
- Lens mount: Fujifilm G
- Lens: Interchangeable lens
- Compatible lenses: Fujinon

Sensor/medium
- Sensor type: CMOS with Bayer filter
- Sensor size: 43.8 mm x 32.9 mm (Medium format)
- Sensor maker: Sony
- Maximum resolution: 51.4 megapixels 8256 × 6192
- Film speed: 100–12800 (standard); 50–102400 (extend)
- Storage media: SD, SDHC, SDXC, UHS-II

Focusing
- Focus: Intelligent Hybrid AF; TTL contrast AF / TTL phase detection AF
- Focus modes: Single point, Zone, Wide/Tracking
- Focus areas: 117 focus point

Exposure/metering
- Exposure: TTL 256-zone metering
- Exposure modes: Program AE, Aperture Priority AE, Shutter Speed Priority AE, Manual Exposure
- Exposure metering: Through-the-lens
- Metering modes: Multi, Spot, Average, Center Weighted

Flash
- Flash: Dedicated TTL Flash
- Flash synchronization: 1/125 s
- Compatible flashes: TTL Flash compatible

Shutter
- Shutter: Focal Plane Shutter
- Shutter speeds: 4 s to 1/4000 s (mechanical), 4 s to 1/16000 s (electronic)
- Continuous shooting: 3.0 fps

Viewfinder
- Viewfinder: EVF viewfinder with eye sensor
- Electronic viewfinder: 0.5" 3.69M dots OLED
- Frame coverage: 100%

Image processing
- White balance: Auto, Custom, Preset, Fluorescent, Incandescent, Underwater
- WB bracketing: ±1, ±2, ±3
- Dynamic range bracketing: 100%, 200%, 400%

General
- Video recording: MOV; 1080p up to 30 fps
- LCD screen: 3.2" 2.36K dots touchscreen tilt-type monitor
- Battery: NP-T125 Li-ion
- AV port(s): HDMI D, ⌀2.5 mm audio jack
- Data port: USB-C 3.2, Wi-Fi 4, Bluetooth
- Body features: Ultra Sonic Vibration Sensor Cleaning System
- Dimensions: 160.7 mm × 96.5 mm × 66.4 mm (6.33 in × 3.80 in × 2.61 in)
- Weight: 775 g (27 oz) (1.709 lb) including battery and memory card
- Made in: Japan

Chronology
- Predecessor: Fujifilm GFX 50S

The Fujifilm GFX 50R is a mirrorless medium format camera produced by Fujifilm. It shares its image sensor, processor and most of its components with the larger GFX 50S. The 50R is smaller and less expensive than the 50S and styled similarly to the Fujifilm X-E series.

The camera was announced by the corporation on September 25, 2018. The camera has been available for sale since November 2018.

It is a mirrorless medium format camera incorporating a large sensor, 1.7 times the size of a full-size 35mm image sensor.

Unlike the 50S, the 50R only has a smaller electronic viewfinder located on the left of the body. The 50S has a larger viewfinder located in its center.

The GFX 50R was discontinued in September 2021 upon the announcement of the Fujifilm GFX50S II.

== Key Features ==
- 51.4MP medium format CMOS sensor (43.8 × 32.9mm) with Bayer filter array
- AF-point-selection joystick
- Weather-sealed
- 1/125 sec flash sync speed
- 3 fps continuous shooting
- 1080/30p video capture
- In-camera Raw processing
- Dual SD card slots (UHS-II)
- USB C socket
- Wi-Fi with Bluetooth
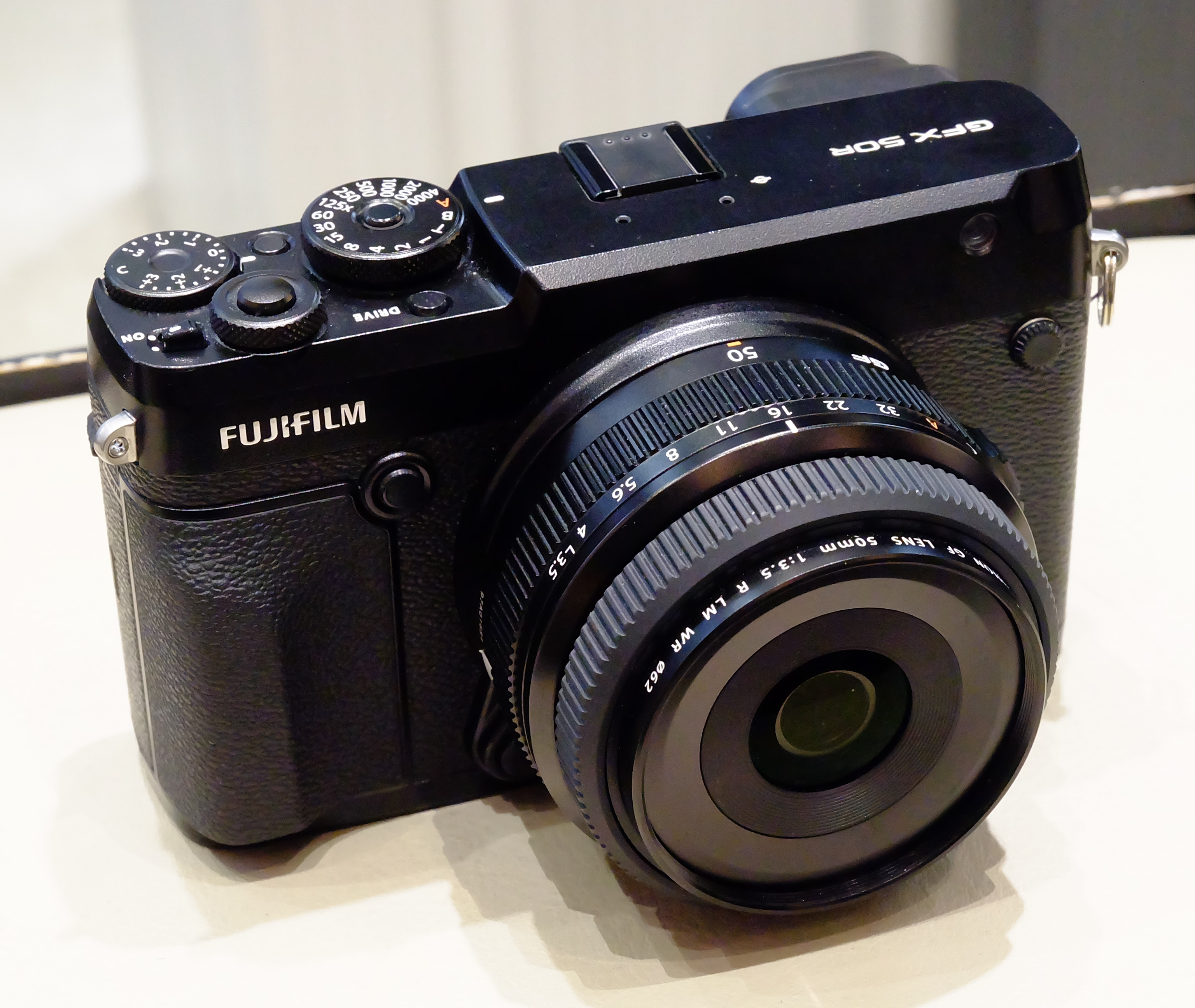

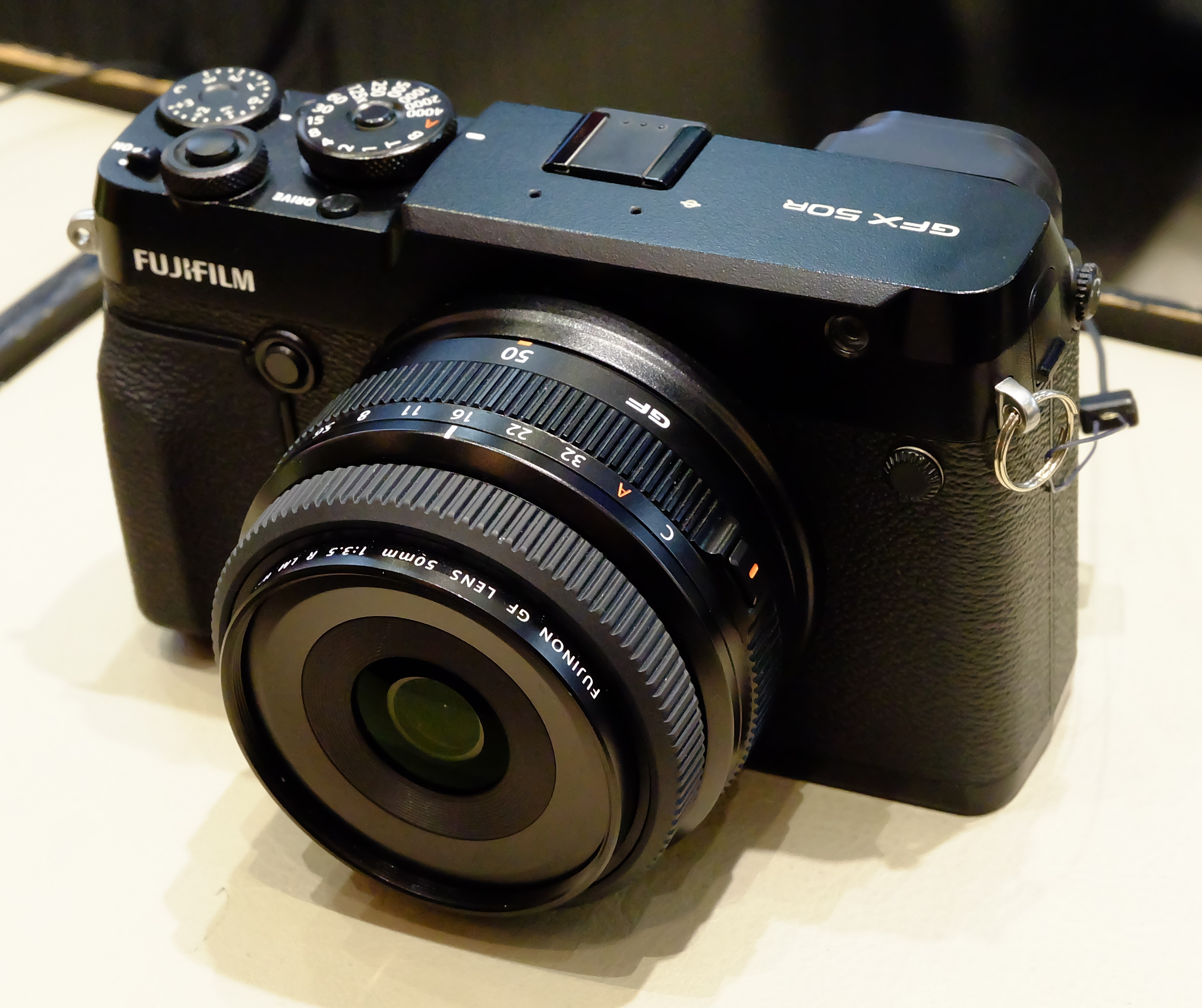

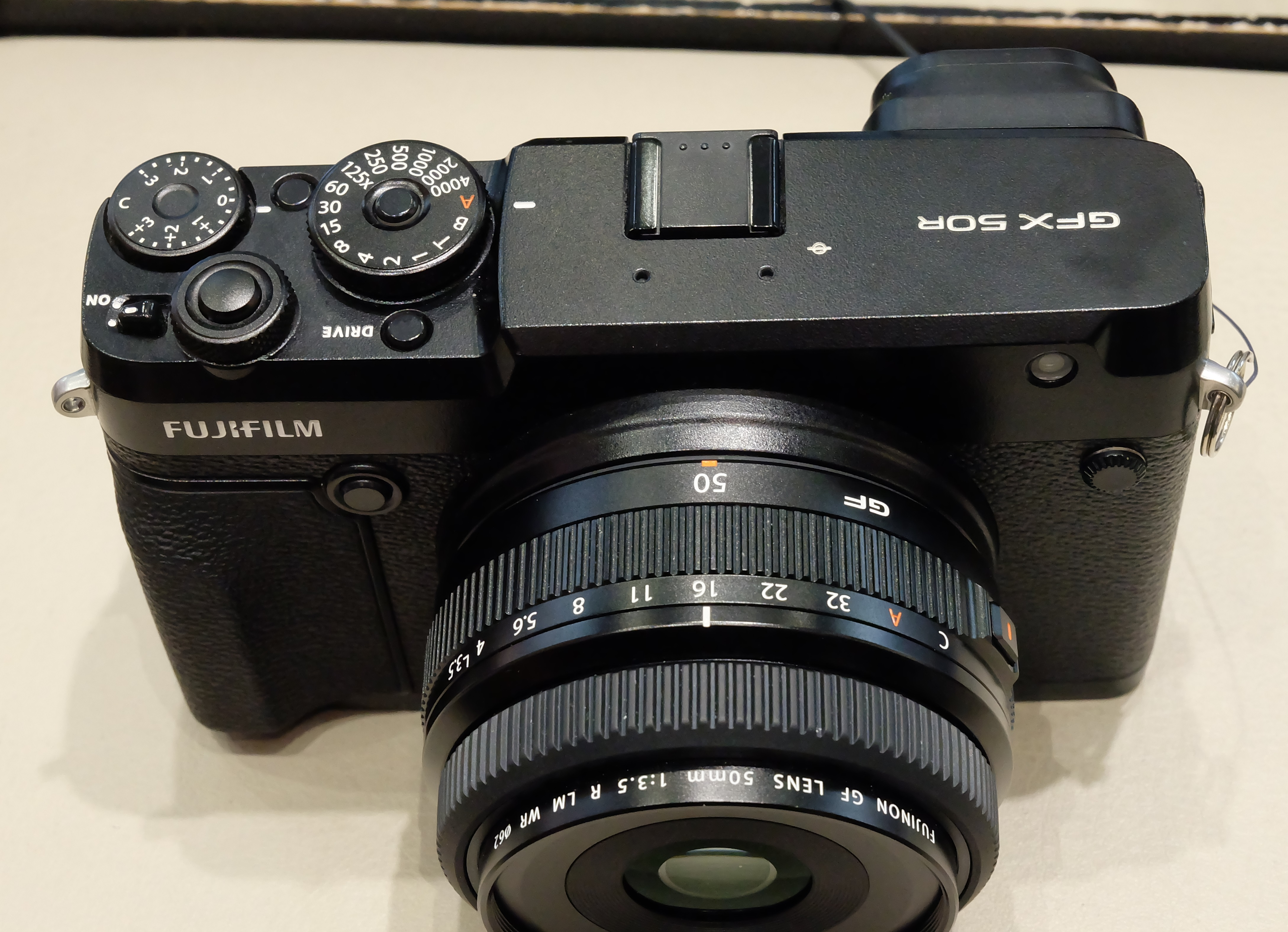

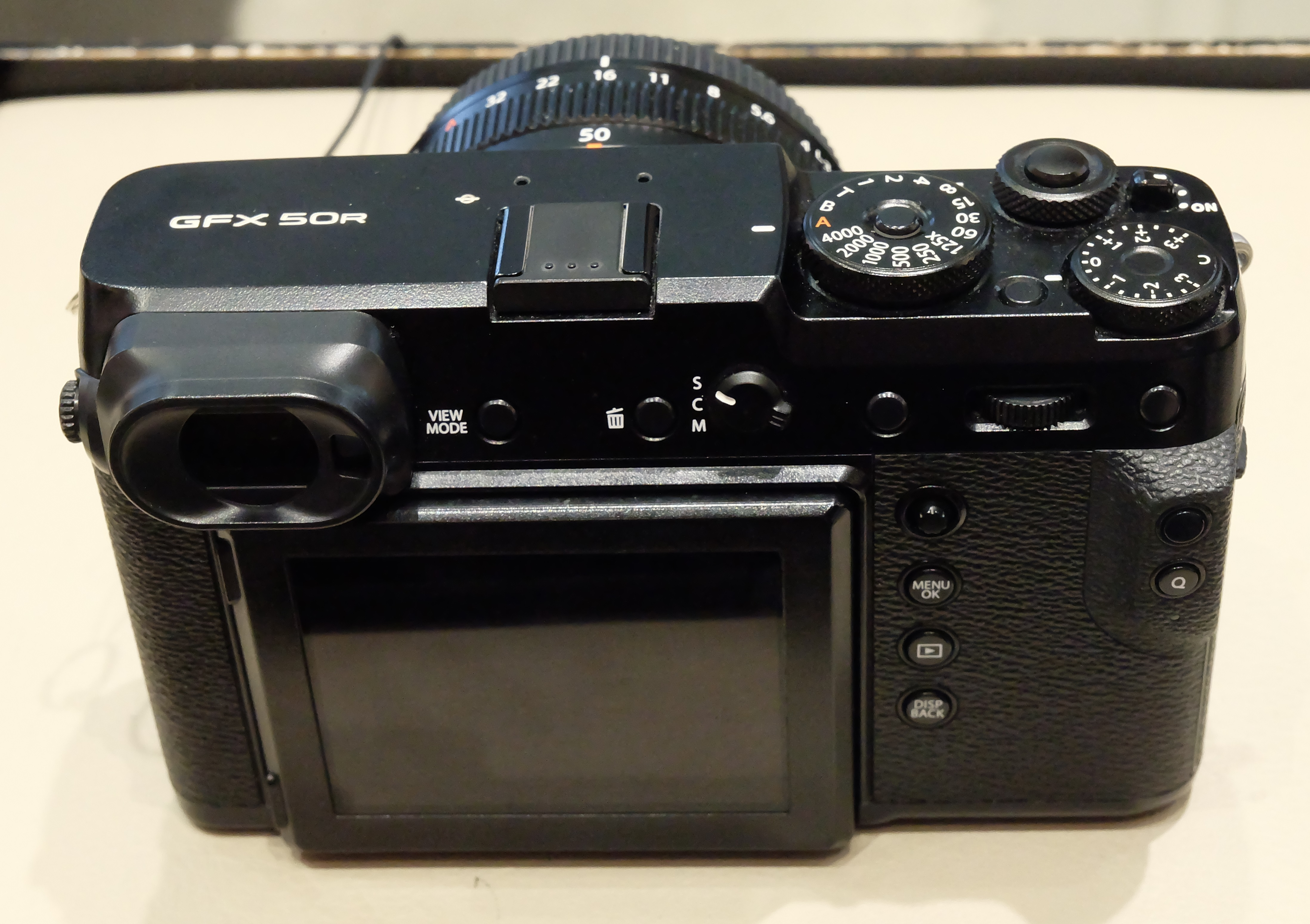

== See also ==
- Fujifilm GFX 50S
- Fujifilm G-mount
- List of retro-style digital cameras

Type	Lens	2011	2012	2013	2014	2015	2016	2017	2018	2019	2020	2021	2022	2023	2024	2025	2026
MILC	G-mount; Medium format sensor							GFX 50S ^{F} ^{T}					GFX 50S II ^{F} ^{T}				
MILC	G-mount; Medium format sensor									GFX 50R ^{F} ^{T}							
MILC	G-mount; Medium format sensor										GFX 100 ^{F} ^{T}					GFX 100 II ^{F} ^{T}	
MILC	G-mount; Medium format sensor											GFX 100 IR ^{F} ^{T}					
MILC	G-mount; Medium format sensor											GFX 100S ^{F} ^{T}				GFX 100S II ^{F} ^{T}	
MILC	G-mount; Medium format sensor															GFX Eterna 55 ^{F} ^{T}	
MILC	Prime lens Medium format sensor															GFX 100RF ^{F} ^{T}	
MILC	X-mount; APS-C sensor		X-Pro1				X-Pro2				X-Pro3 ^{f} ^{T}						
MILC	X-mount; APS-C sensor								X-H1 ^{F} ^{T}					X-H2 ^{A} ^{T}			
MILC	X-mount; APS-C sensor													X-H2S ^{A} ^{T}			
MILC	X-mount; APS-C sensor											X-S10 ^{A} ^{T}			X-S20 ^{A} ^{T}		
MILC	X-mount; APS-C sensor				X-T1 ^{f}			X-T2 ^{F}		X-T3 ^{F} ^{T}		X-T4 ^{A} ^{T}		X-T5 ^{F} ^{T}			
MILC	X-mount; APS-C sensor															X-T50 ^{f} ^{T}	
MILC	X-mount; APS-C sensor						X-T10 ^{f}	X-T20 ^{f} ^{T}		X-T30 ^{f} ^{T}			X-T30 II ^{f} ^{T}			X-T30 III ^{f} ^{T}	
MILC	X-mount; APS-C sensor									_{15} X-T100 ^{F} ^{T}	X-T200 ^{A} ^{T}						
MILC	X-mount; APS-C sensor			X-E1	X-E2		X-E2s		X-E3 ^{T}			X-E4 ^{f} ^{T}				X-E5 ^{f} ^{T}	
MILC	X-mount; APS-C sensor				X-M1 ^{f}											X-M5 ^{A} ^{T}	
MILC	X-mount; APS-C sensor				X-A1 ^{f}	X-A2 ^{f}		X-A3 ^{f} ^{T}	_{15} X-A5 ^{f} ^{T}		X-A7 ^{A} ^{T}						
MILC	X-mount; APS-C sensor							X-A10 ^{f}	X-A20 ^{f} ^{T}								
Compact	Prime lens APS-C sensor	X100		X100S		X100T		X100F			X100V ^{f} ^{T}				X100VI ^{f} ^{T}		
Compact	Prime lens APS-C sensor						X70 ^{f} ^{T}			XF10 ^{T}							
Compact	Prime lens 1" sensor															X half ^{T}	
Compact	Zoom lens^{2}/_{3}" sensor		X10	X20		X30 ^{f}											
Compact	Zoom lens^{2}/_{3}" sensor				XQ1	XQ2											
Compact	Zoom lens^{2}/_{3}" sensor			XF1													
Bridge	^{2}/_{3}" sensor		X-S1 ^{f}														
Type	Lens																
Type	Lens	2011	2012	2013	2014	2015	2016	2017	2018	2019	2020	2021	2022	2023	2024	2025	2026
