= Fujifilm G-mount =

Interchangeable camera lens mount design

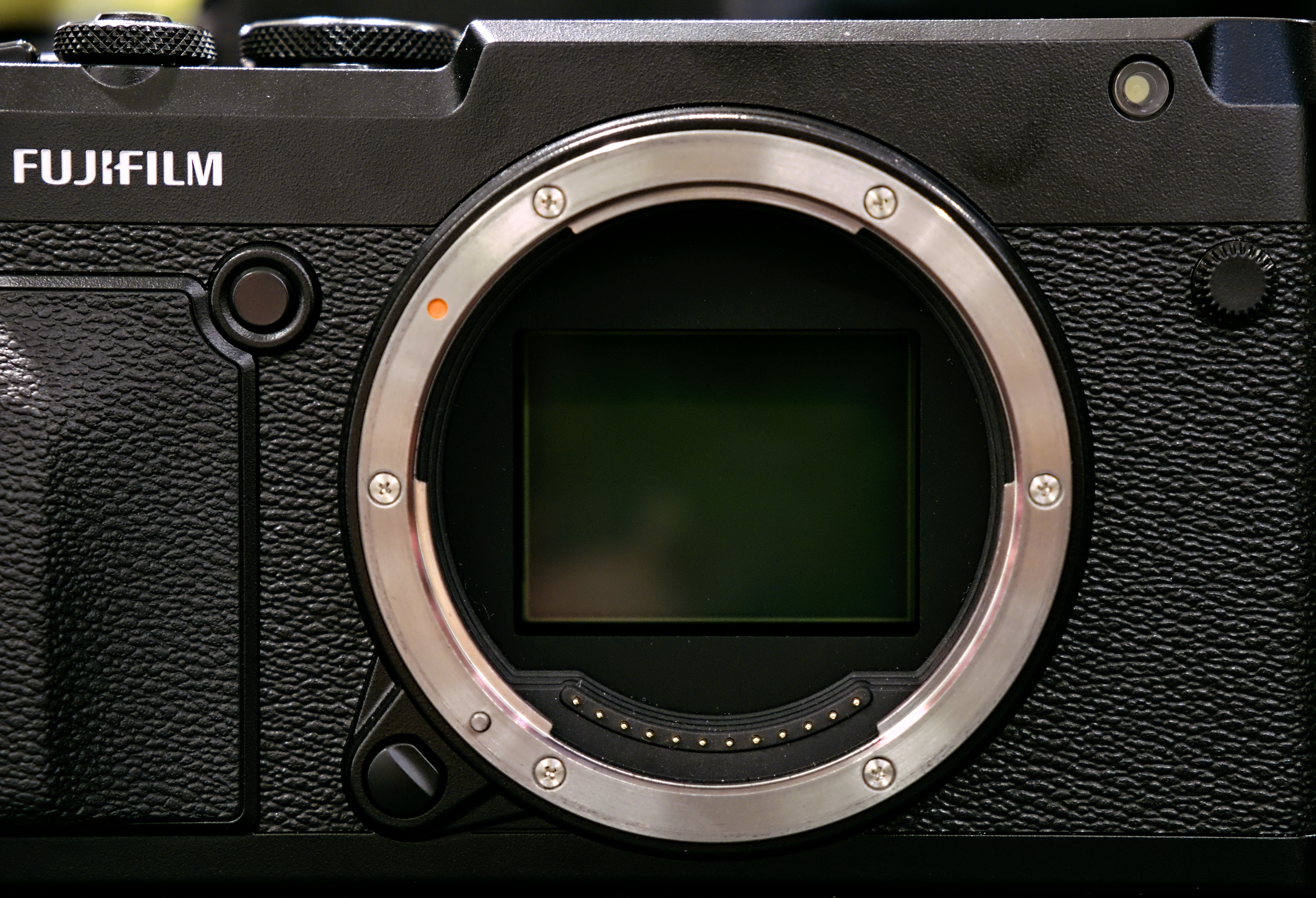
- Fujifilm G-mount of Fujifilm GFX 50R body
- Type: Internal bayonet
- External diameter: 76.5 mm
- Inner diameter: 65 mm
- Tabs: 3
- Flange: 26.7 mm
- Connectors: 12

The Fujifilm G-mount is a type of interchangeable lens mount designed by Fujifilm for use in the cameras of their Fujifilm GFX series. These cameras have interchangeable lenses. The respective lenses are designed for 43.8 mm x 32.9 mm medium format sensors.

== Fujifilm G-mount cameras ==
Fujifilm has released the following cameras that use the G-mount:

- Fujifilm GFX 50S
- Fujifilm GFX 50R
- Fujifilm GFX100
- Fujifilm GFX100S
- Fujifilm GFX50S II
- Fujifilm GFX100 II
- Fujifilm GFX100S II

== Fujifilm G-mount lens system ==
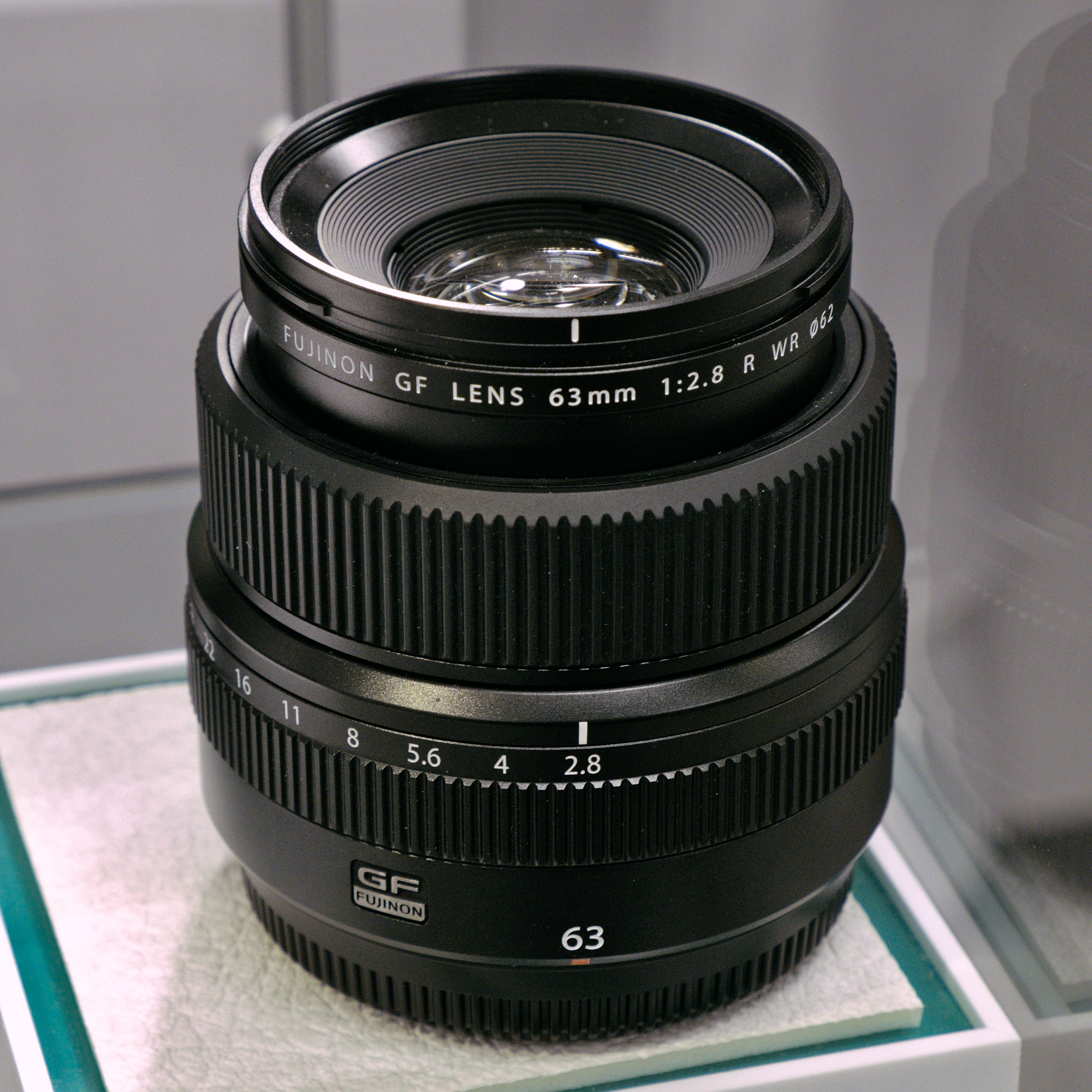
Fujinon GF 63mm f/2.8 R WR standard prime lens

The crop factor and depth of field compared to the 35 mm format as a reference is 0.79. Ratio of the reference frame's diagonal (35 mm format) to the diagonal of the image sensor in question (Fujifilm GFX): $\dfrac{\sqrt{(24 mm)^2+(36 mm)^2}}{\sqrt{(32.9 mm)^2+(43.8 mm)^2}}\approx0.790$

As of May 2026 a total of 49 lenses are available for the G-mount (including the GF 1.4x teleconverter); 20 from Fujifilm's Fujinon brand and 29 from third party companies.

The most significant difference between Fujinon and third party lenses is that all Fujinon lenses (with the exception of two manual tilt/shift lenses) support autofocus, whereas all of the third party lenses released before May 2026 require manual focus. This is now set to change: according to respected websites two third party lenses that have been announced to be released in the course of 2026 will support autofocusing in combination with a GFX body.

Manufacturer	Lens Name	Release date (ISO8601)	Focal Length	35mm equiv.	F-Stop Range	Angle of View	Length	Diameter	Weight	MFD	MM	Aperture Blades	Auto focus	OIS	Filter Size	Lens Design	Comments
Fujinon	GF23mm f/4 R LM WR	2017-04-19	23mm	18mm f/3.2	4-32	99.9°	103mm	90mm	845g	38cm	0.09x	9	Yes	No	82mm	15/12	
Fujinon	GF 30mm f/3.5 R WR	2020	30mm	24mm f/2.8	3.5-32	84.7°	99mm	84mm	510g	32cm	0.15x	9	Yes	No	58mm	13/10	
Fujinon	GF 30mm f/5.6 T/S	2023-12-0	30mm	24mm f/4.4	5.6-	84.7°	138mm	87mm	1,340g	30cm	0.21x	9	No	No	105mm	16/11	
Fujinon	GF 45mm f/2.8 R WR	2017-09-07	45mm	36mm f/2.2	2.8-32	62.6°	88mm	84mm	490g	45cm	0.14x	9	Yes	No	62mm	11/8	
Fujinon	GF 50mm f/3.5 R LM WR	2019-07-18	50mm	40mm f/2.8	3.5-32	57.4°	48mm	84mm	335g	55cm	0.10x	9	Yes	No	62mm	9/6	
Fujinon	GF 55mm f/1.7 R WR	2023-09-23	55mm	44mm f/1.3	1.7-22	52.9°	99.3mm	94.7mm	780g	50cm	0.17x	11	Yes	No	77mm	14/10	
Fujinon	GF 63mm f/2.8 R WR	2017-01-19	63mm	50mm f/2.2	2.8-32	46.9°	71mm	84mm	405g	50cm	0.17x	9	Yes	No	62mm	10/8	
Fujinon	GF 80mm f/1.7 R WR	2021	80mm	63mm f/1.3	1.7-22	37.7°	99mm	95mm	795g	70cm	0.15x	9	Yes	No	77mm	12/9	
Fujinon	GF 110mm f/2 R LM WR	2017-04-19	110mm	87mm f/1.6	2-22	27.9°	126mm	94mm	1,010g	90cm	0.16x	9	Yes	No	77mm	14/9	
Fujinon	GF 110mm f/5.6 T/S Macro	2023-12-0	110mm	87mm f/4.5	5.6-	27.9°	149mm	95mm	1,255g	43cm	0.5x	9	No	No	72mm	11/9	
Fujinon	GF 120mm f/4 R LM OIS WR Macro	2017-01-19	120mm	95mm f/3.2	4-32	25.7°	153mm	89mm	980g	45cm	0.50x	9	Yes	Yes	72mm	14/9	
Fujinon	GF 250mm f/4 R LM OIS WR	2018-04-12	250mm	198mm f/3.2	4-32	12.5°	204mm	108mm	1,425g	14cm	0.22x	9	Yes	Yes	82mm	16/10	
Fujinon	GF 500mm f/5.6 R LM OIS WR	2024-05-16	500mm	396mm f/4.4	5.6-32	-	247mm	105mm	1,375g	-	-	9	Yes	Yes	95mm	21/14	
Fujinon	GF 20-35mm F/4 R WR	2022-09-09	20-35mm	16-28mm f/3.2	4-22	107°-75°	113mm	89mm	725g	35cm	0.14x	9	Yes	No	82mm	14/10	
Fujinon	GF 32-64mm f/4 R LM WR	2017-01-19	32-64mm	25-51mm f/3.2	4-32	81°-46.3°	116mm-146mm	93mm	875g	50cm-60cm	0.12x	9	Yes	No	77mm	14/11	
Fujinon	GF35-70mm f/4.5-5.6 WR	2021	35-70mm	28-55 f/3.6-4.4	4.5 to 5.6-32	76°-42.7°	74mm	85mm	390g	35cm	0.28x	9	Yes	No	62mm	11/9	
Fujinon	GF 45-100mm f/4 R LM OIS WR	2020-01-23	45-100mm	36-79mm f/3.2	4-32	62.6° to 30.6°	145mm	93mm	1,005g	65cm	0.13x	9	Yes	Yes	82mm	16/12	
Fujinon	GF 100-200mm f/5.6 R LM OIS WR	2019-01-17	100-200mm	79-158mm f/4.4	5.6-32	30.6° - 15.6°	183mm	90mm	1,050g	60cm-160cm	0.20x	9	Yes	Yes	67mm	20/13	
Fujinon	GF 1.4x TC WR	2018-04-12	N/A	N/A	N/A	N/A	27mm	82mm	400g	N/A	N/A	N/A	Yes	N/A	N/A	7/3	Teleconverter
AstrHori	MF 8mm F2.4	2026-10-16	8mm	?	2.4-16	?	?	?	511g	10cm	?	10	No	No	N/A	10/8	Circular Fisheye
AstrHori	MF 40mm f/5.6	2022-10-13	40mm	31.6mm f/4.4	5.6-22	69°	-	-	333g	41cm	-	-	No	No	62mm	7/5	
AstrHori	MF 55mm f/5.6	2022-10-18	55mm	43mm f/4.4	5.6-22	52°	-	-	350g	59cm	-	-	No	No	62mm	5/5	
AstrHori	MF 75mm f/4	2022-08-23	75mm	60mm f/3.2	4-16	44.2°	-	-	634.5g	82cm	-	-	No	No	-	8-6	
IRIX	Irix 45mm f1.4	2021	45mm	36mm f/1.1	1.4-22	62.64°	144mm	87mm	1120g	40cm	?	9	No	No	77mm	11/9	
Kase	150mm F5.6 AF Reflex	2026-05-29 (expected release date)	150mm	118.5mm	5.6 (fixed aperture)	?	?	?	?	145cm	?	?	Yes	No	67mm	5/4	mirror lens with fixed aperture
Kase	200mm F5.6 MC Reflex	?	200mm	158mm	5.6	?	?	?	?	?	?	?	No	No	62mm	?	?
Kipon	Iberit 75mm f/2.4	2019	75mm	60mm f/1.9	2.4-16	32.2°	65mm	58mm	270g	70cm	?	6	No	No	49mm	5/5	
Meike	AF 85mm F1.8	2026-07-20	85mm	67mm	1.8-16	?	?	?	406g	65cm	?	11	Yes	No	62mm	7/11	
Mitakon Zhongyi	Creator 28mm f/5.6	?	28mm	22mm	5.6-22	?	?	?	?	?	?	?	No	No	37mm	?	
Mitakon Zhongyi	Pittura 30mm f/2.4	2026-07-31	30mm	24mm	2.4-22	?	?	?	?	20cm	?	11	No	No	72mm	13/12	
Mitakon Zhongyi	Speedmaster 65mm f/1.4	2018	65mm	51mm f/1.1	1.4-16	46°	96mm	82mm	1,050g	70cm	0.25x	9	No	No	72mm	11/7	
Mitakon Zhongyi	Speedmaster 65mm f/1.4 II	2026	65mm	51mm f/1.1	1.4-16	46°	95mm	80.5mm	900g	70cm	0.25x	11	No	No	67mm	11/7	
Mitakon Zhongyi	Speedmaster 80mm f/1.6	?	80mm	63mm	1.6-22	?	?	?	?	?	?	?	No	No	77mm	?	
Mitakon Zhongyi	Speedmaster 85mm f/1.2	2018	85mm	67mm f/0.95	1.2-16	29°	83mm	96mm	921g	100cm	0.09x	11	No	No	77mm	9/6	
Mitakon Zhongyi	Creator 135mm f/2.5	-	135mm	107mm f/2	2.5-22	-	-	-	-	-	-	-	No	No	67mm	9/7	
Mitakon Zhongyi	200mm f/4 1x Macro	?	200mm	158mm	4-32	?	?	?	?	?	1x	?	No	No	67mm	?	
NiSi	16mm f/2.8 ASPH	2026-07-19	16mm	?	2.8	?	?	?	?	?	?	8	No	No	82mm	?	
NiSi	250mm f/5.6 Reflex	?	250mm	198mm	5.6	?	?	?	?	?	?	?	No	No	62mm	?	
SG-image	MF 75mm f1.2		75mm	60mm f/0.95	1.2	?	?	?	?	?	?	?	No	No	72mm	?	
TTArtisan	TTArtisan 11mm f/2.8 Fisheye G	-	11mm	8.6mm f/2.2	2.8-16	-	-	-	-	-	-	-	No	No	-	-	
TTArtisan	Tilt-Shift 17mm F4 ASPH	2025-10-10	17mm	13mm	4-16	?	100mm	88mm	?	30cm	?	?	No	No	-	17/11	±8 Tilt-Shift
TTArtisan	90mm f/1.25 G	-	90mm	63mm	1.25-16	-	-	-	-	-	-	-	No	No	-	-	
TTArtisan	100mm f2.8 Macro 2X	?	100mm	79mm	2.8-22	?	?	?	?	?	2x	?	No	No	62mm	?	
TTArtisan	500mm f/6.3	?	500mm	395mm	6.3-32	?	?	?	?	?	?	?	No	No	82mm	?	
Venus Optics	Laowa 8-15mm f/2.8 FF Zoom Fisheye	2025-08	10-19mm	8-15mm	2.8-22	?	?	?	?	?	?	?	No	No	N/A	?	FF Design
Venus Optics	Laowa 15mm f/4.5R Zero-D Shift	-	15mm	12mm f/3.6	4.5-22	?	?	?	?	?	?	?	No	No	?	?	±8mm shift
Venus Optics	Laowa 17mm f/4 Ultra-Wide Zero-D	2019	17mm	13mm f/3.2	4-32	113°	124mm	88mm	829g	20cm	0.27x	5	No	No	86mm	21/14	
Venus Optics	Laowa 17mm f/4 Zero-D Tilt-Shift / Shift	?	17mm	13mm	4-32	?	?	?	?	?	?	?	?	?	?	?	±10° tilt, ±8mm shift
Venus Optics	Laowa 19mm f/2.8 Zero-D	?	19mm	15mm f/2.2	2.8-22	?	?	?	546g	18cm	?	?	No	No	77mm	?	
Venus Optics	Laowa 20mm f/4 Zero-D Shift	-	20mm	16mm f/3.2	4-22	?	?	?	?	?	?	?	No	No	82mm	?	±8mm shift
Venus Optics	Laowa 35mm f/2.8 Zero-D Tilt-Shift 0.5× Macro	?	44mm	35mm	2.8-22	?	?	?	?	?	0.5x	?	?	?	?	?	
Venus Optics	Laowa 55mm f/2.8 Tilt-Shift 1x Macro	?	70mm	55mm	2.8-22	?	?	?	?	?	1x	?	No	No	77mm	?	+/- 10° Tilt, 8° Shift
Venus Optics	Laowa 100mm f/2.8 Tilt-Shift 1x Macro	?	127mm	100mm	2.8-22	?	?	?	?	?	1x	?	No	No	77mm	?	+/- 10° Tilt, 8° Shift

Cine Lens

Manufacturer	Lens Name	Release date (ISO8601)	Focal Length	35mm equiv.	F-Stop Range	Angle of View	Length	Diameter	Weight	MFD	MM	Aperture Blades	Auto focus	OIS	Filter Size	Lens Design	Comments
Fujinon	GF19-35mmT3.5 PZ OIS WR	2026-07	19-35mm		T3.5-32	110.0°-76°	222.5mm	123.5mm	2,090g	55cm	0.1x	13	Yes	Yes	111mm	23/15	
Fujinon	GF32-90mmT3.5 PZ OIS WR	2025-09	32-90mm	25-71mm	T3.5-32	81°-33.8°	222.5mm	123.5mm	2,150g	80cm	0.06x	13	Yes	Yes	111mm	25/19	
Leitz	HEKTOR 18mm T2.1	2026-05	18mm		T2.1-22							9	No	No			Sold as E Mount with G replacement
Leitz	HEKTOR 25mm T2.1	2026-05	25mm		T2.1-22							9	No	No	77mm		Sold as E Mount with G replacement
Leitz	HEKTOR 35mm T2.1	2026-05	35mm		T2.1-22							9	No	No	77mm		Sold as E Mount with G replacement
Leitz	HEKTOR 50mm T2.1	2026-05	50mm		T2.1-22							9	No	No	77mm		Sold as E Mount with G replacement
Leitz	HEKTOR 73mm T2.1	2026-05	73mm		T2.1-22							9	No	No	77mm		Sold as E Mount with G replacement
Leitz	HEKTOR 100mm T2.1	2026-05	100mm		T2.1-22							9	No	No	77mm		Sold as E Mount with G replacement
NiSi	14mm ATHENA T2.4		14mm		T2.4-22		117.3mm		865g			10	No	No	N/A		FF design, 35mm Format to avoid vignetting
NiSi	18mm ATHENA T2.2		18mm		T2.2-22								No	No	77mm		FF design, 35mm Format to avoid vignetting
NiSi	25mm ATHENA T1.9		25mm		T1.9-22								No	No	77mm		FF design
NiSi	35mm ATHENA T1.9		35mm		T1.9-22								No	No	77mm		FF design
NiSi	40mm ATHENA T1.9		40mm		T1.9-22								No	No	77mm		FF design
NiSi	50mm ATHENA T1.9		50mm		T1.9-22								No	No	77mm		FF design
NiSi	85mm ATHENA T1.9		85mm		T1.9-22								No	No	77mm		FF design
NiSi	135mm ATHENA T2.2		135mm		T2.2-22								No	No	77mm		FF design

== See also ==
- Fujinon
- Fujifilm X-mount
- Fujifilm X series

Type	Lens	2011	2012	2013	2014	2015	2016	2017	2018	2019	2020	2021	2022	2023	2024	2025	2026
MILC	G-mount; Medium format sensor							GFX 50S ^{F} ^{T}					GFX 50S II ^{F} ^{T}				
MILC	G-mount; Medium format sensor									GFX 50R ^{F} ^{T}							
MILC	G-mount; Medium format sensor										GFX 100 ^{F} ^{T}					GFX 100 II ^{F} ^{T}	
MILC	G-mount; Medium format sensor											GFX 100 IR ^{F} ^{T}					
MILC	G-mount; Medium format sensor											GFX 100S ^{F} ^{T}				GFX 100S II ^{F} ^{T}	
MILC	G-mount; Medium format sensor															GFX Eterna 55 ^{F} ^{T}	
MILC	Prime lens Medium format sensor															GFX 100RF ^{F} ^{T}	
MILC	X-mount; APS-C sensor		X-Pro1				X-Pro2				X-Pro3 ^{f} ^{T}						
MILC	X-mount; APS-C sensor								X-H1 ^{F} ^{T}					X-H2 ^{A} ^{T}			
MILC	X-mount; APS-C sensor													X-H2S ^{A} ^{T}			
MILC	X-mount; APS-C sensor											X-S10 ^{A} ^{T}			X-S20 ^{A} ^{T}		
MILC	X-mount; APS-C sensor				X-T1 ^{f}			X-T2 ^{F}		X-T3 ^{F} ^{T}		X-T4 ^{A} ^{T}		X-T5 ^{F} ^{T}			
MILC	X-mount; APS-C sensor															X-T50 ^{f} ^{T}	
MILC	X-mount; APS-C sensor						X-T10 ^{f}	X-T20 ^{f} ^{T}		X-T30 ^{f} ^{T}			X-T30 II ^{f} ^{T}			X-T30 III ^{f} ^{T}	
MILC	X-mount; APS-C sensor									_{15} X-T100 ^{F} ^{T}	X-T200 ^{A} ^{T}						
MILC	X-mount; APS-C sensor			X-E1	X-E2		X-E2s		X-E3 ^{T}			X-E4 ^{f} ^{T}				X-E5 ^{f} ^{T}	
MILC	X-mount; APS-C sensor				X-M1 ^{f}											X-M5 ^{A} ^{T}	
MILC	X-mount; APS-C sensor				X-A1 ^{f}	X-A2 ^{f}		X-A3 ^{f} ^{T}	_{15} X-A5 ^{f} ^{T}		X-A7 ^{A} ^{T}						
MILC	X-mount; APS-C sensor							X-A10 ^{f}	X-A20 ^{f} ^{T}								
Compact	Prime lens APS-C sensor	X100		X100S		X100T		X100F			X100V ^{f} ^{T}				X100VI ^{f} ^{T}		
Compact	Prime lens APS-C sensor						X70 ^{f} ^{T}			XF10 ^{T}							
Compact	Prime lens 1" sensor															X half ^{T}	
Compact	Zoom lens^{2}/_{3}" sensor		X10	X20		X30 ^{f}											
Compact	Zoom lens^{2}/_{3}" sensor				XQ1	XQ2											
Compact	Zoom lens^{2}/_{3}" sensor			XF1													
Bridge	^{2}/_{3}" sensor		X-S1 ^{f}														
Type	Lens																
Type	Lens	2011	2012	2013	2014	2015	2016	2017	2018	2019	2020	2021	2022	2023	2024	2025	2026
