= Fujifilm GFX50S II =

Medium format camera

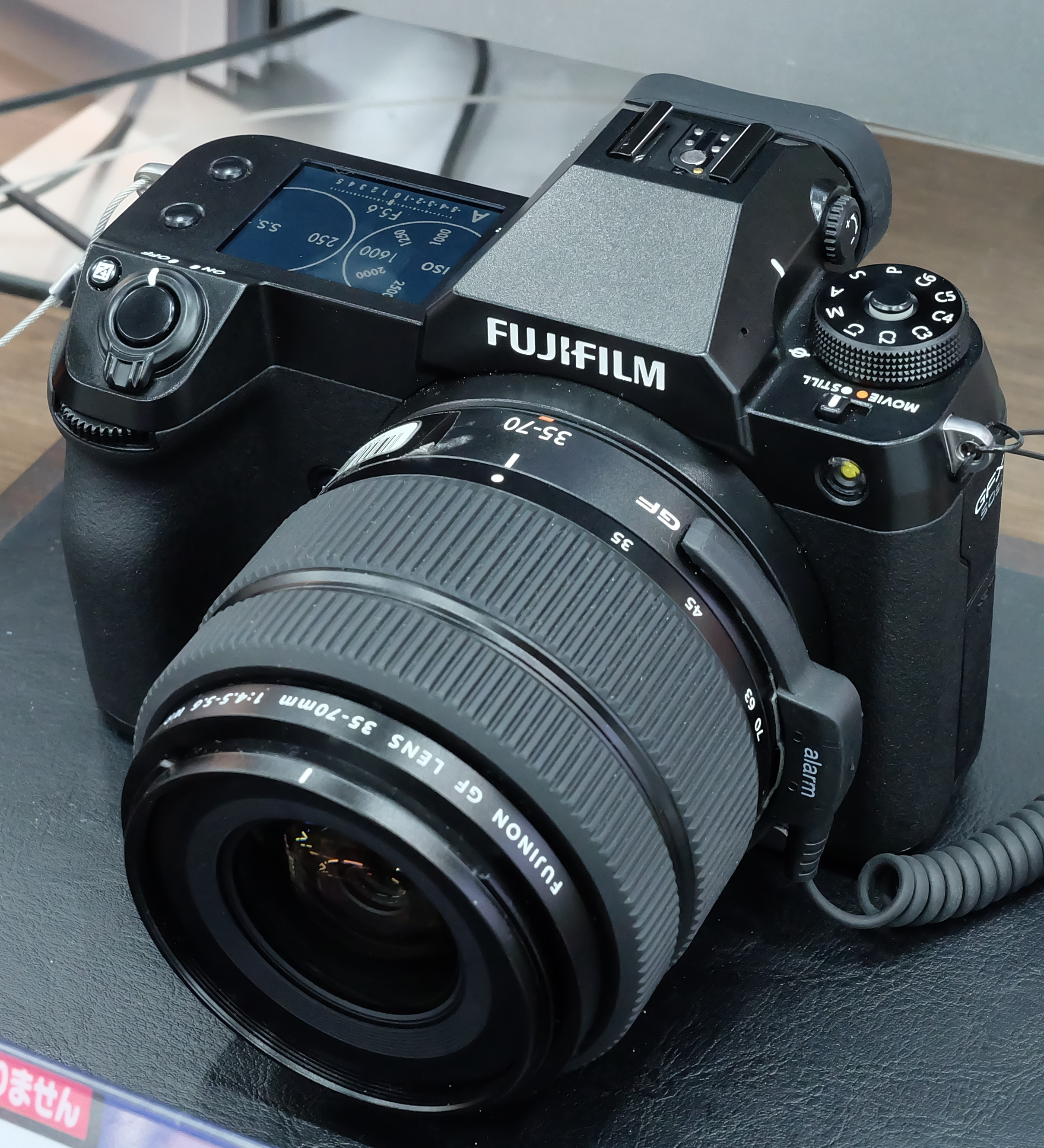
- GFX50S II +GF35-70mm f/4.5-5.6 WR

Overview
- Maker: Fujifilm
- Type: Mirrorless Camera
- Released: 29 September 2021; 5 years ago
- Intro price: USD 3,999 (body), USD 4,499(kit)

Lens
- Lens mount: Fujifilm G
- Lens: Interchangeable lens

Sensor/medium
- Sensor type: CMOS with Bayer filter
- Sensor size: 43.8 mm x 32.9 mm (Medium format)
- Sensor maker: Sony
- Maximum resolution: 8256 x 6192 (51.4 megapixels)
- Film speed: 100–12800 (standard); 50–102400 (extend)
- Recording medium: SD, SDHC, SDXC (UHS-II)
- Storage media: dual SD card, each UHS-II

Focusing
- Focus: TTL contrast detection
- Focus modes: Single point, Zone, Wide/Tracking
- Focus areas: 117 focus point

Exposure/metering
- Exposure: TTL 256-zones metering
- Exposure modes: Program, Aperture Priority, Shutter Speed Priority, Manual Exposure
- Metering modes: Multi, Spot, Average

Flash
- Flash: External Flash
- Flash synchronization: 1/125 s
- Flash bracketing: ±1/3EV / ±2/3EV / ±1EV
- Compatible flashes: Dedicated TTL Flash compatible

Shutter
- Shutter: Focal Plane Shutter
- Shutter speeds: 4 s to 1/4000 s (mechanical), 4 s to 1/6000 s (electronic)
- Continuous shooting: 3 frames per second

Viewfinder
- Viewfinder: 0.5 inches 3.69M dots OLED
- Viewfinder magnification: 0.77
- Frame coverage: 100%

Image processing
- Image processor: X-Processor 4
- White balance: Auto, Custom, Preset, Fluorescent, Incandescent, Underwater
- WB bracketing: ±1, ±2, ±3
- Dynamic range bracketing: 100%, 200%, 400%

General
- Video recording: MP4 / MOV; 1080p up to 30 fps
- LCD screen: 3.2 inches 2.36M dots Tilt touchscreen
- Battery: NP-W235 Li-ion
- AV port(s): 3.5 mm and 2.5 mm audio jack, HDMI D
- Data port: USB-C 3.2, Wi-Fi 4, Bluetooth 4.2
- Body features: In-body image stabilization, Ultra Sonic Vibration Sensor Cleaning system
- Dimensions: 150.0 mm × 104.2 mm × 87.2 mm (5.91 in × 4.10 in × 3.43 in)
- Weight: 900 g (32 oz) (2.0 lb) including battery and memory card
- Made in: Japan

Chronology
- Predecessor: Fujifilm GFX 50S

The Fujifilm GFX 50S II is a mirrorless medium format camera produced by Fujifilm. It features the Fujifilm G-mount. The camera, together with the X-T30 II, and some lenses, were announced by Fujifilm during the X Summit in Japan on September 2, 2021 and released at the end of September 2021.

The GFX50SII has the same body as the GFX 100S featuring an improved autofocus (from the GFX 50S) and a powerful in-body image stabilization (IBIS) mechanism.

The camera uses the same 50MP sensor as previous GFX cameras and the X-Processor 4 chip used in GFX 100S.

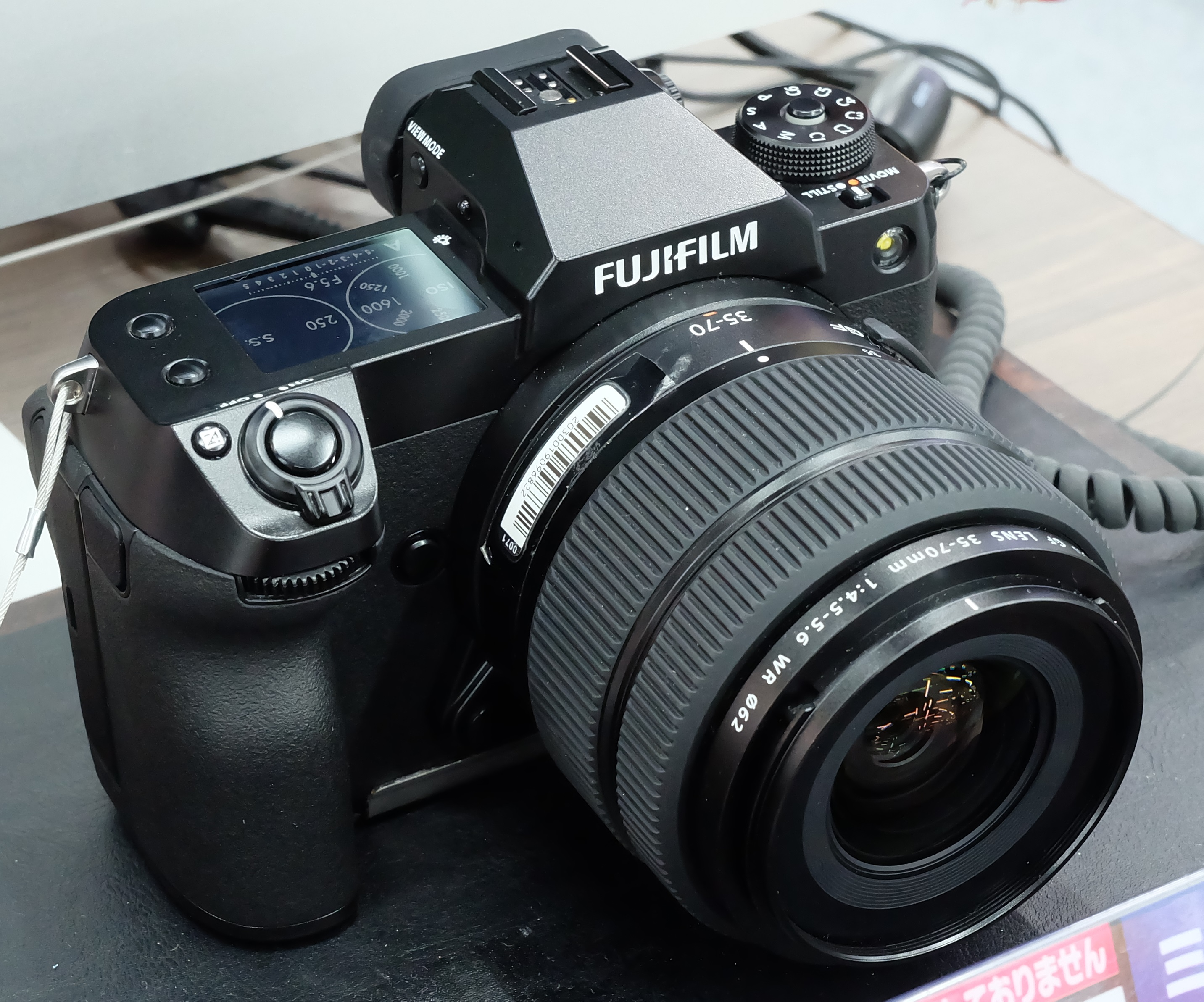

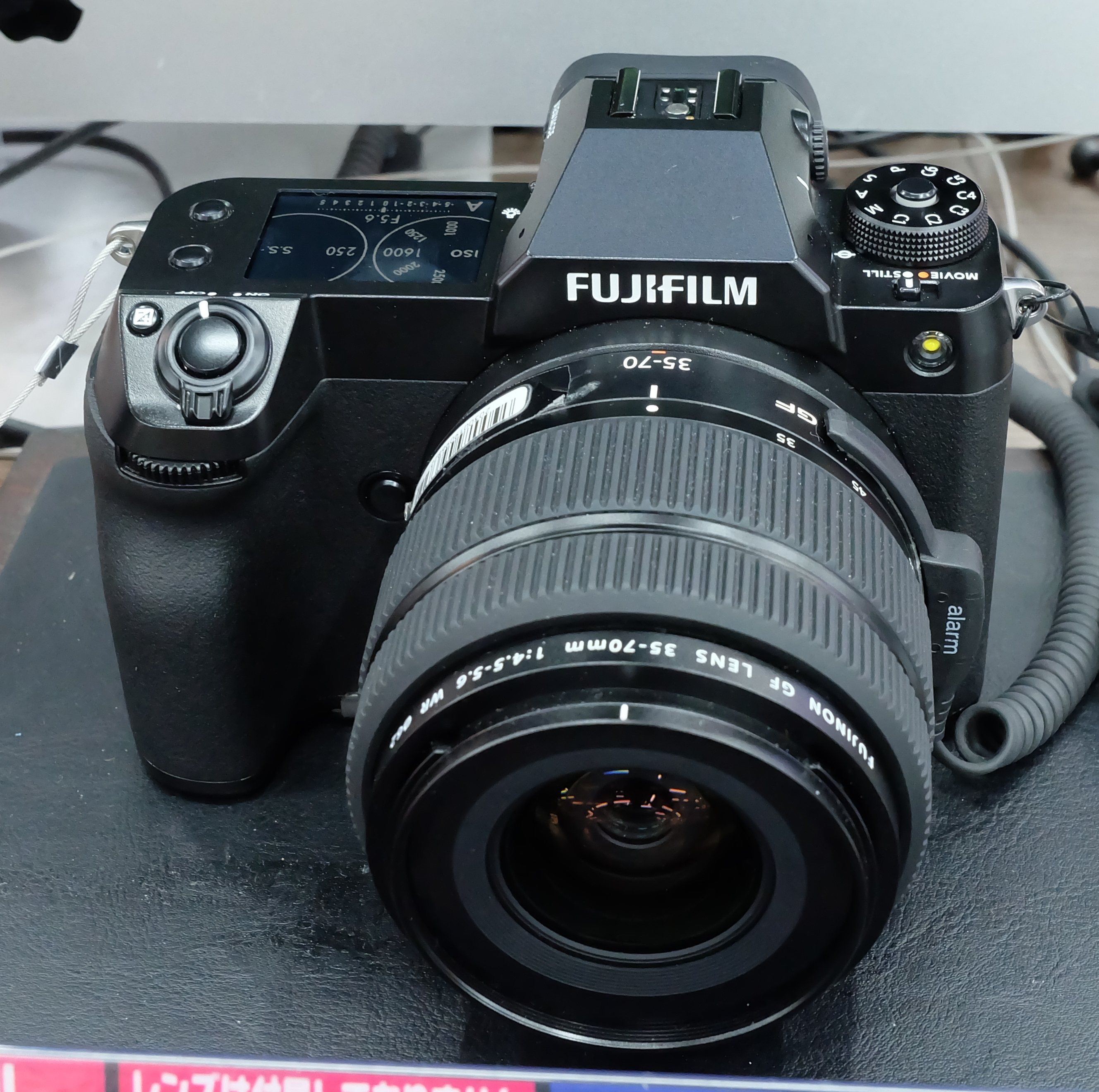

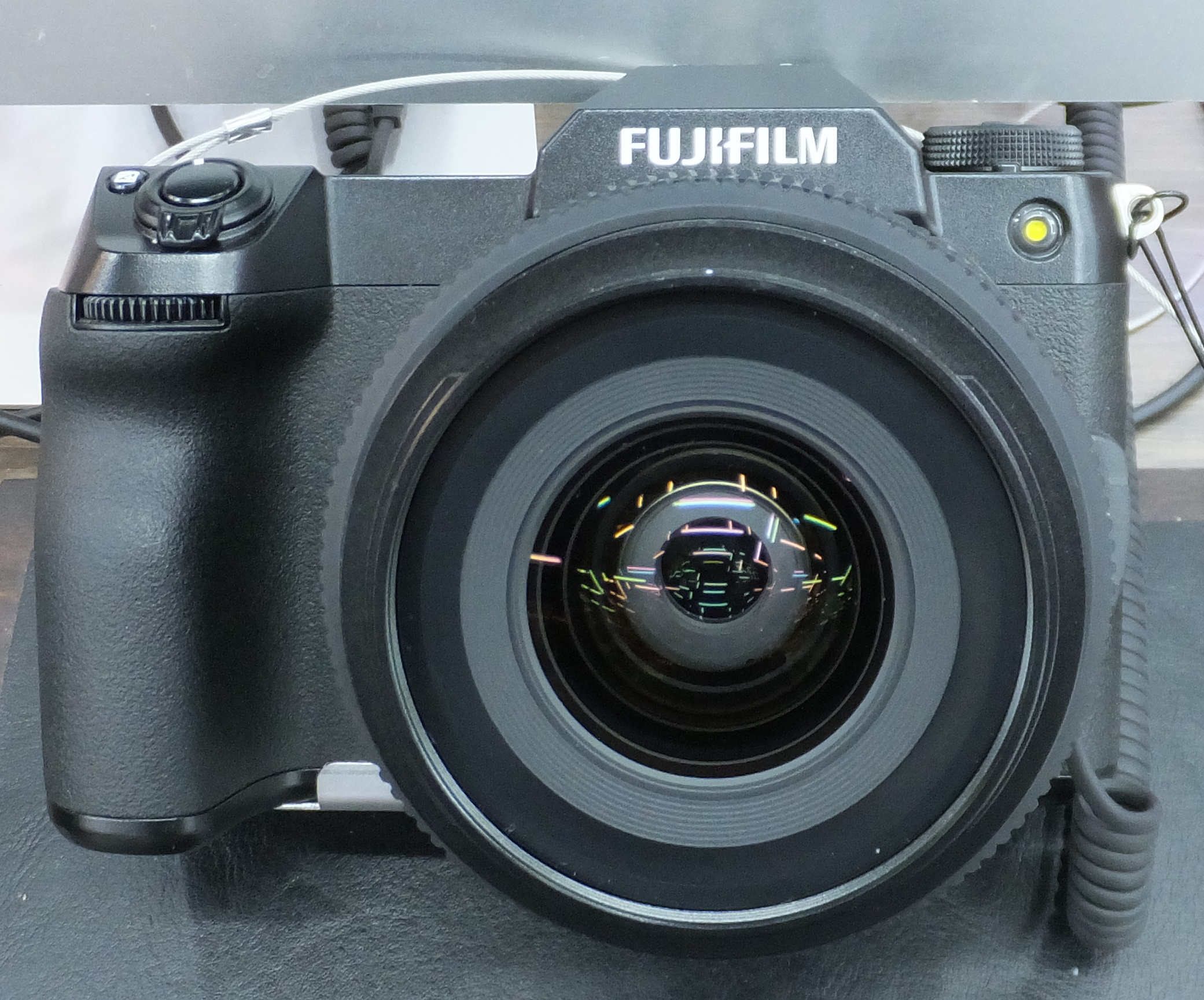

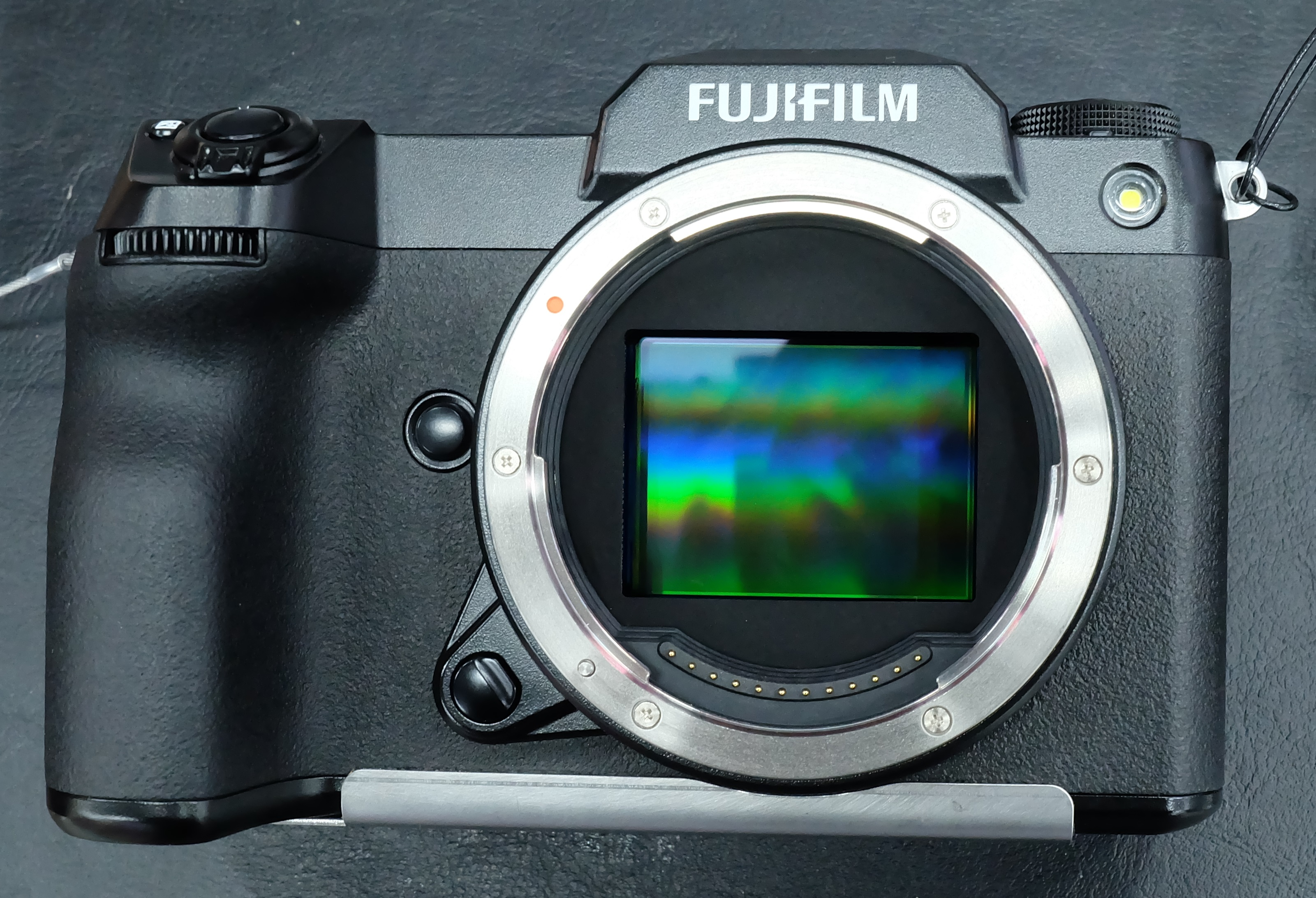

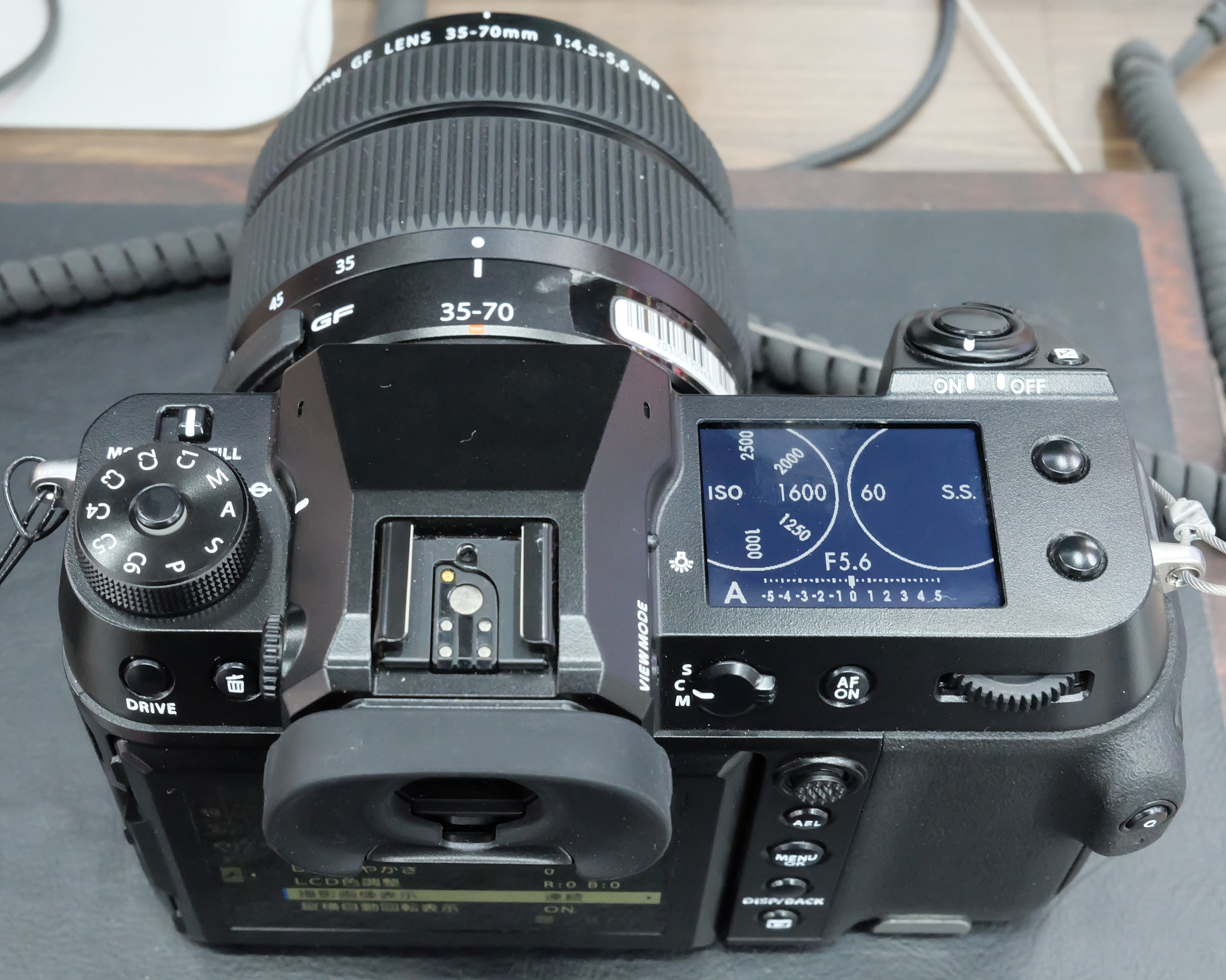

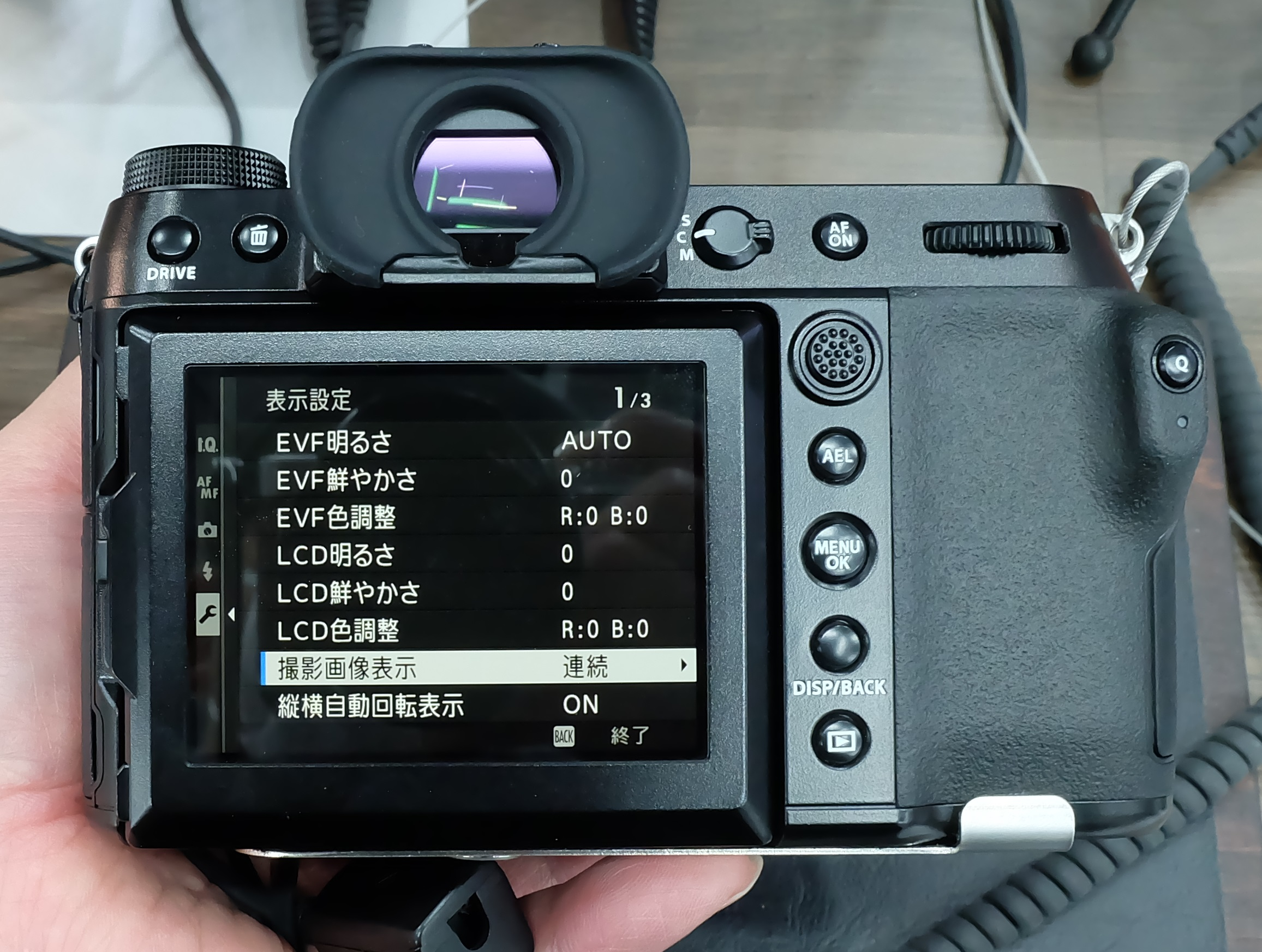

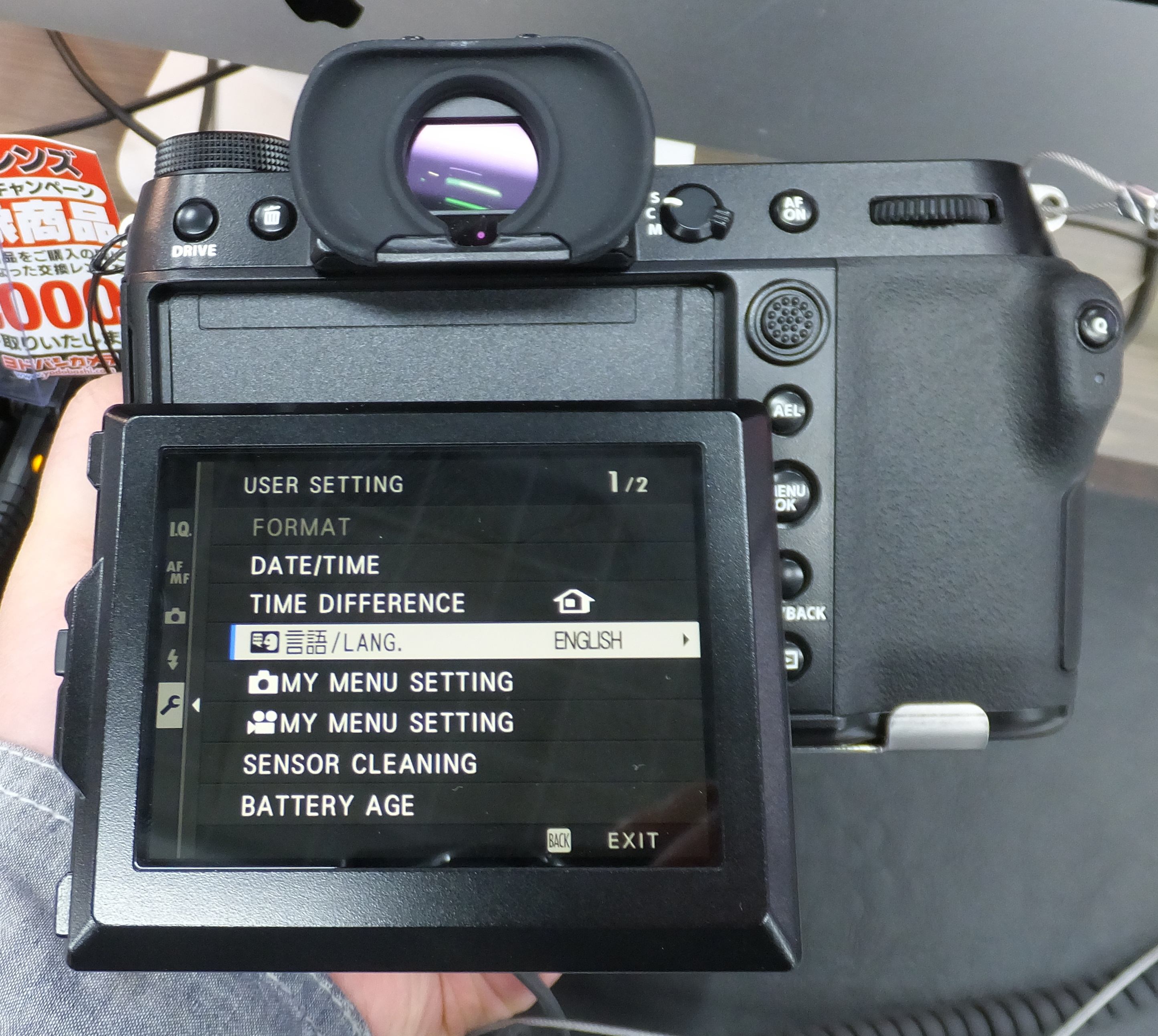

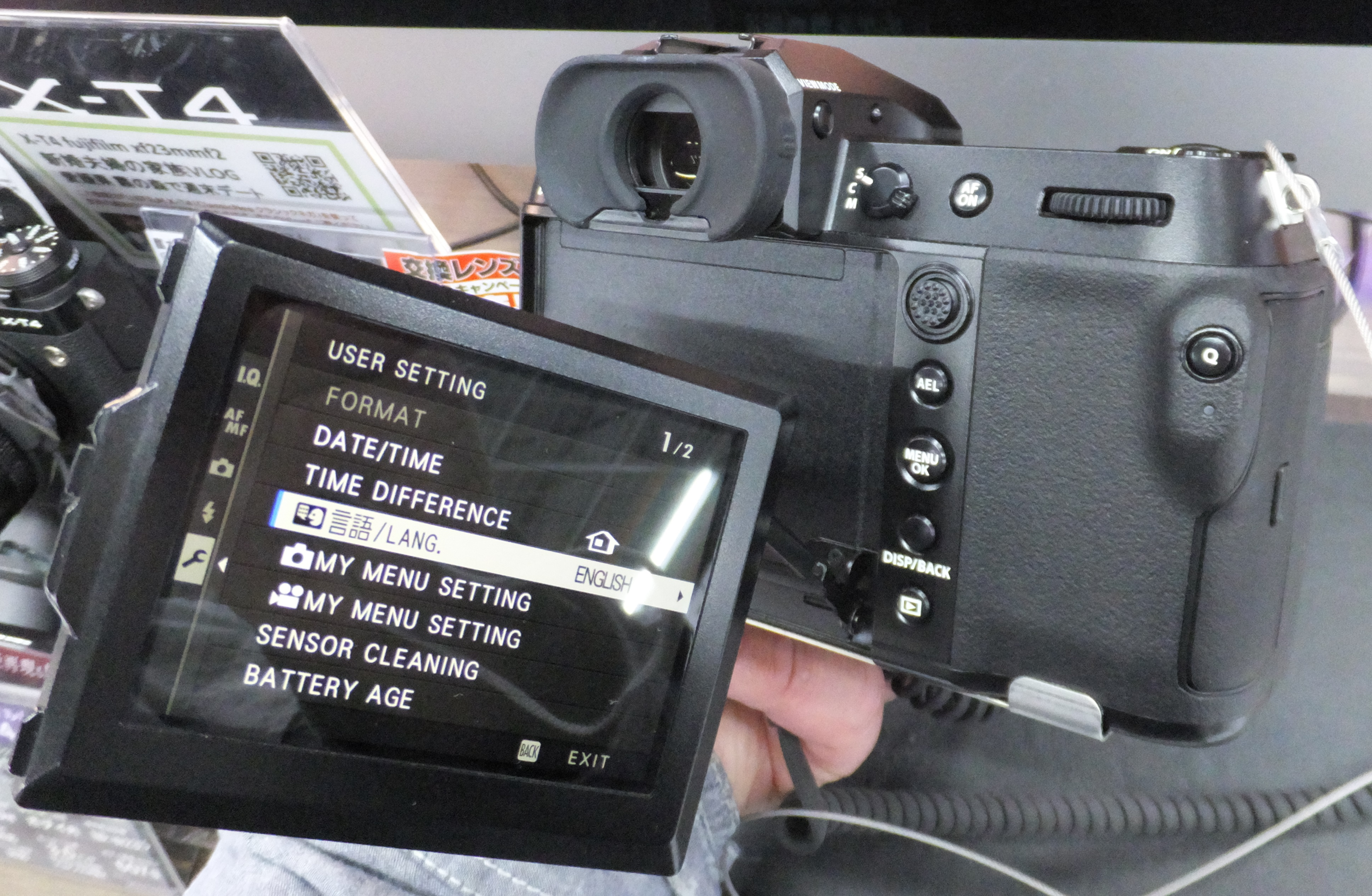

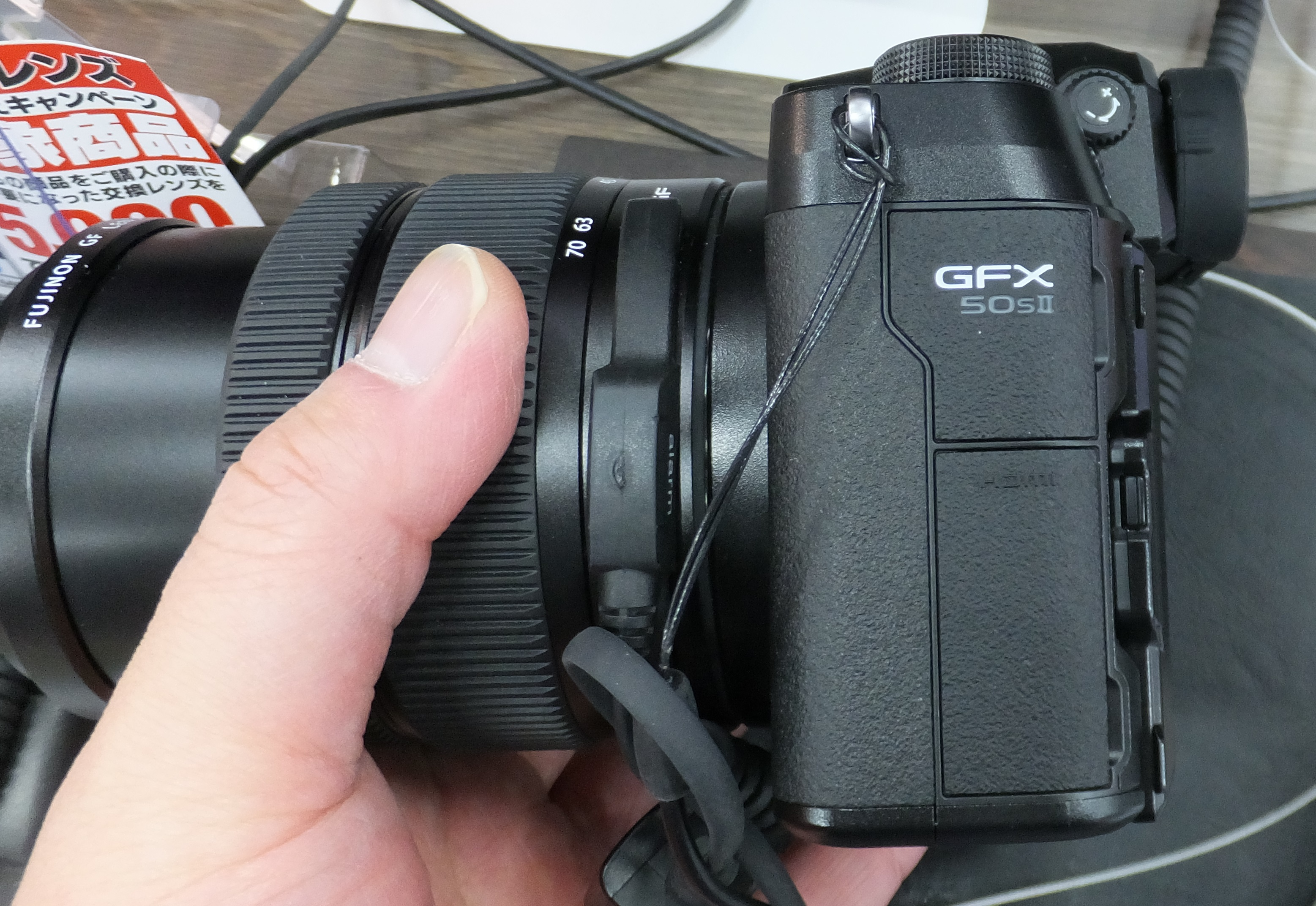

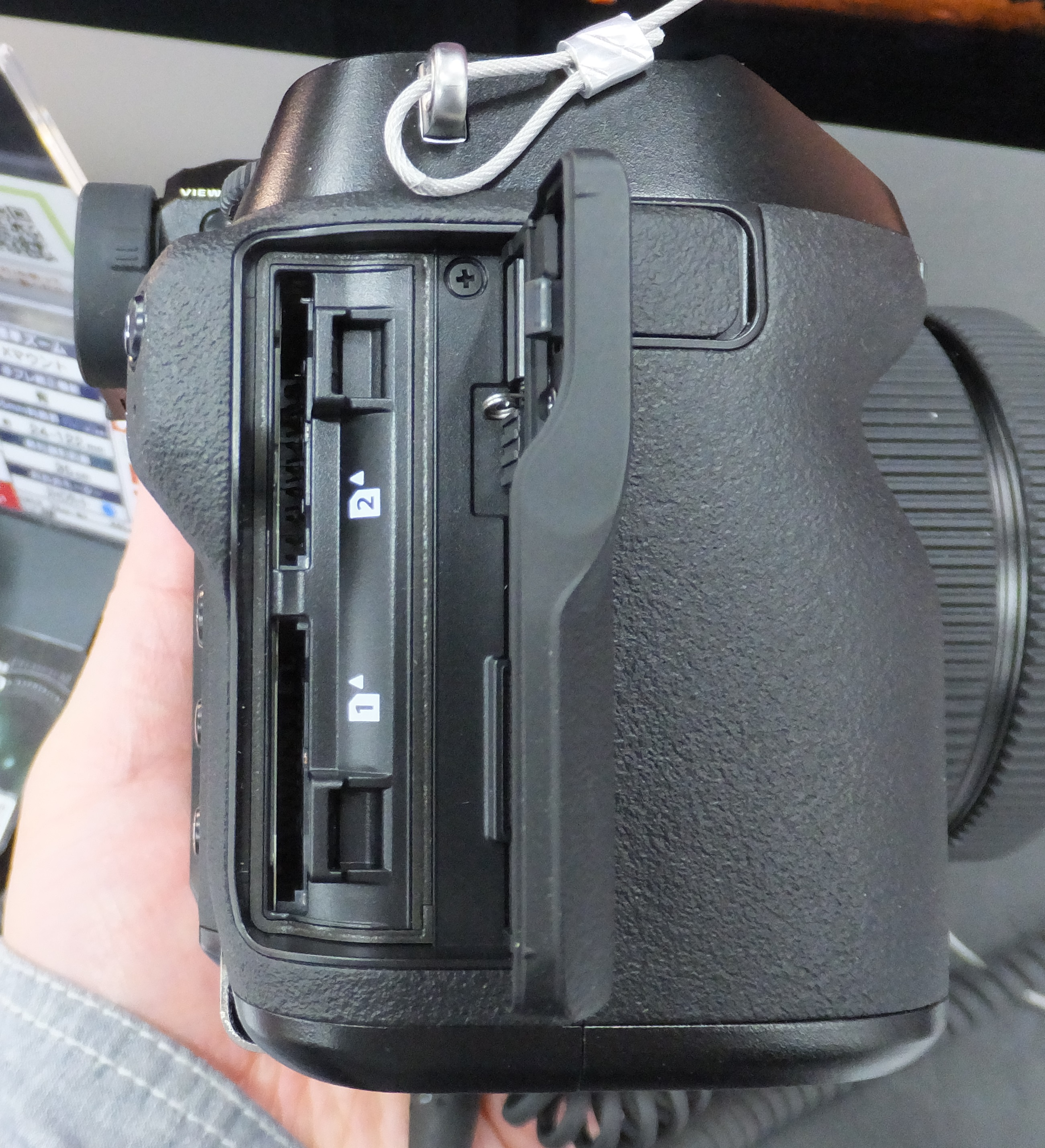

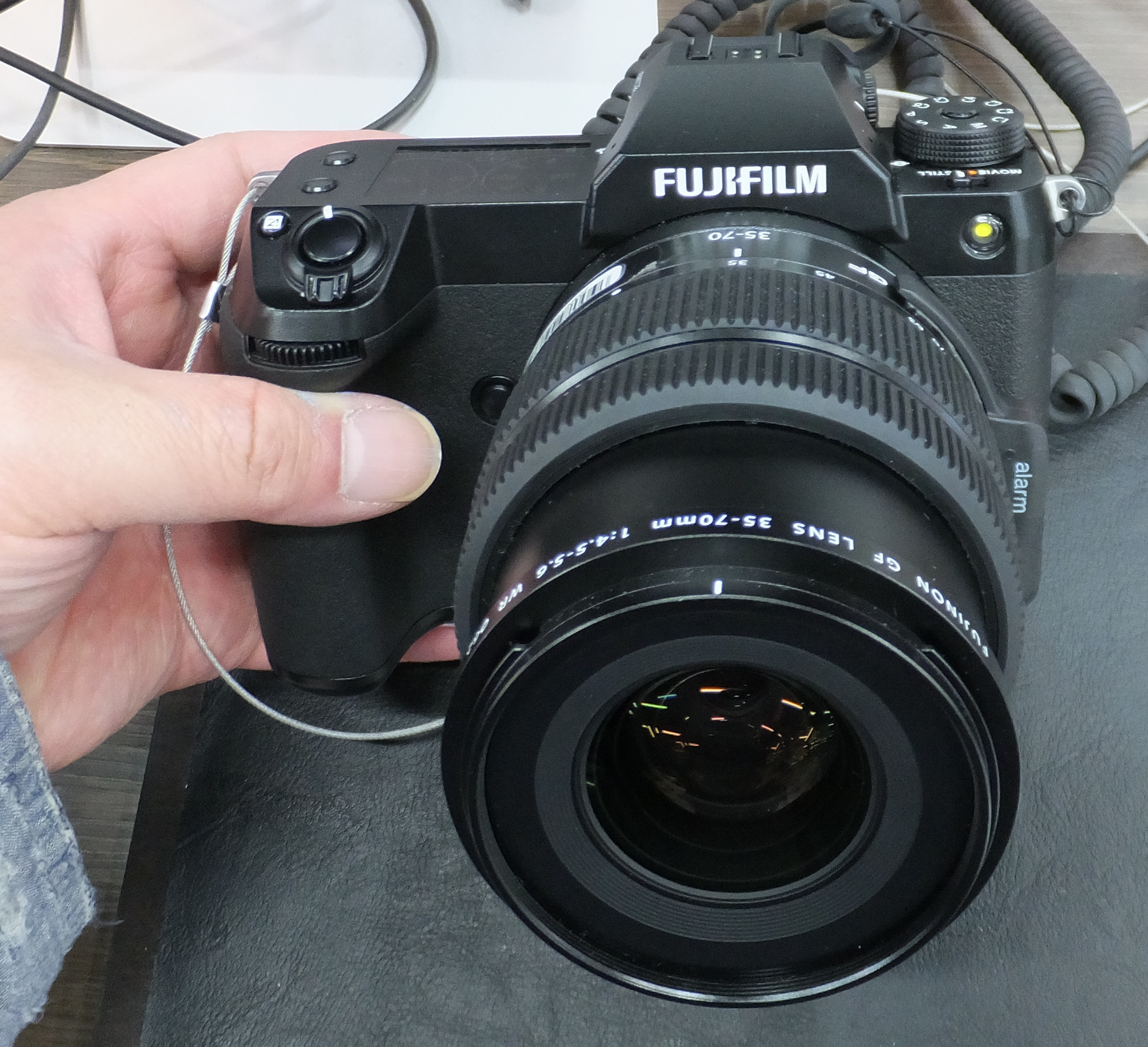

Type	Lens	2011	2012	2013	2014	2015	2016	2017	2018	2019	2020	2021	2022	2023	2024	2025	2026
MILC	G-mount; Medium format sensor							GFX 50S ^{F} ^{T}					GFX 50S II ^{F} ^{T}				
MILC	G-mount; Medium format sensor									GFX 50R ^{F} ^{T}							
MILC	G-mount; Medium format sensor										GFX 100 ^{F} ^{T}					GFX 100 II ^{F} ^{T}	
MILC	G-mount; Medium format sensor											GFX 100 IR ^{F} ^{T}					
MILC	G-mount; Medium format sensor											GFX 100S ^{F} ^{T}				GFX 100S II ^{F} ^{T}	
MILC	G-mount; Medium format sensor															GFX Eterna 55 ^{F} ^{T}	
MILC	Prime lens Medium format sensor															GFX 100RF ^{F} ^{T}	
MILC	X-mount; APS-C sensor		X-Pro1				X-Pro2				X-Pro3 ^{f} ^{T}						
MILC	X-mount; APS-C sensor								X-H1 ^{F} ^{T}					X-H2 ^{A} ^{T}			
MILC	X-mount; APS-C sensor													X-H2S ^{A} ^{T}			
MILC	X-mount; APS-C sensor											X-S10 ^{A} ^{T}			X-S20 ^{A} ^{T}		
MILC	X-mount; APS-C sensor				X-T1 ^{f}			X-T2 ^{F}		X-T3 ^{F} ^{T}		X-T4 ^{A} ^{T}		X-T5 ^{F} ^{T}			
MILC	X-mount; APS-C sensor															X-T50 ^{f} ^{T}	
MILC	X-mount; APS-C sensor						X-T10 ^{f}	X-T20 ^{f} ^{T}		X-T30 ^{f} ^{T}			X-T30 II ^{f} ^{T}			X-T30 III ^{f} ^{T}	
MILC	X-mount; APS-C sensor									_{15} X-T100 ^{F} ^{T}	X-T200 ^{A} ^{T}						
MILC	X-mount; APS-C sensor			X-E1	X-E2		X-E2s		X-E3 ^{T}			X-E4 ^{f} ^{T}				X-E5 ^{f} ^{T}	
MILC	X-mount; APS-C sensor				X-M1 ^{f}											X-M5 ^{A} ^{T}	
MILC	X-mount; APS-C sensor				X-A1 ^{f}	X-A2 ^{f}		X-A3 ^{f} ^{T}	_{15} X-A5 ^{f} ^{T}		X-A7 ^{A} ^{T}						
MILC	X-mount; APS-C sensor							X-A10 ^{f}	X-A20 ^{f} ^{T}								
Compact	Prime lens APS-C sensor	X100		X100S		X100T		X100F			X100V ^{f} ^{T}				X100VI ^{f} ^{T}		
Compact	Prime lens APS-C sensor						X70 ^{f} ^{T}			XF10 ^{T}							
Compact	Prime lens 1" sensor															X half ^{T}	
Compact	Zoom lens^{2}/_{3}" sensor		X10	X20		X30 ^{f}											
Compact	Zoom lens^{2}/_{3}" sensor				XQ1	XQ2											
Compact	Zoom lens^{2}/_{3}" sensor			XF1													
Bridge	^{2}/_{3}" sensor		X-S1 ^{f}														
Type	Lens																
Type	Lens	2011	2012	2013	2014	2015	2016	2017	2018	2019	2020	2021	2022	2023	2024	2025	2026
