= Fujifilm GFX 50S =

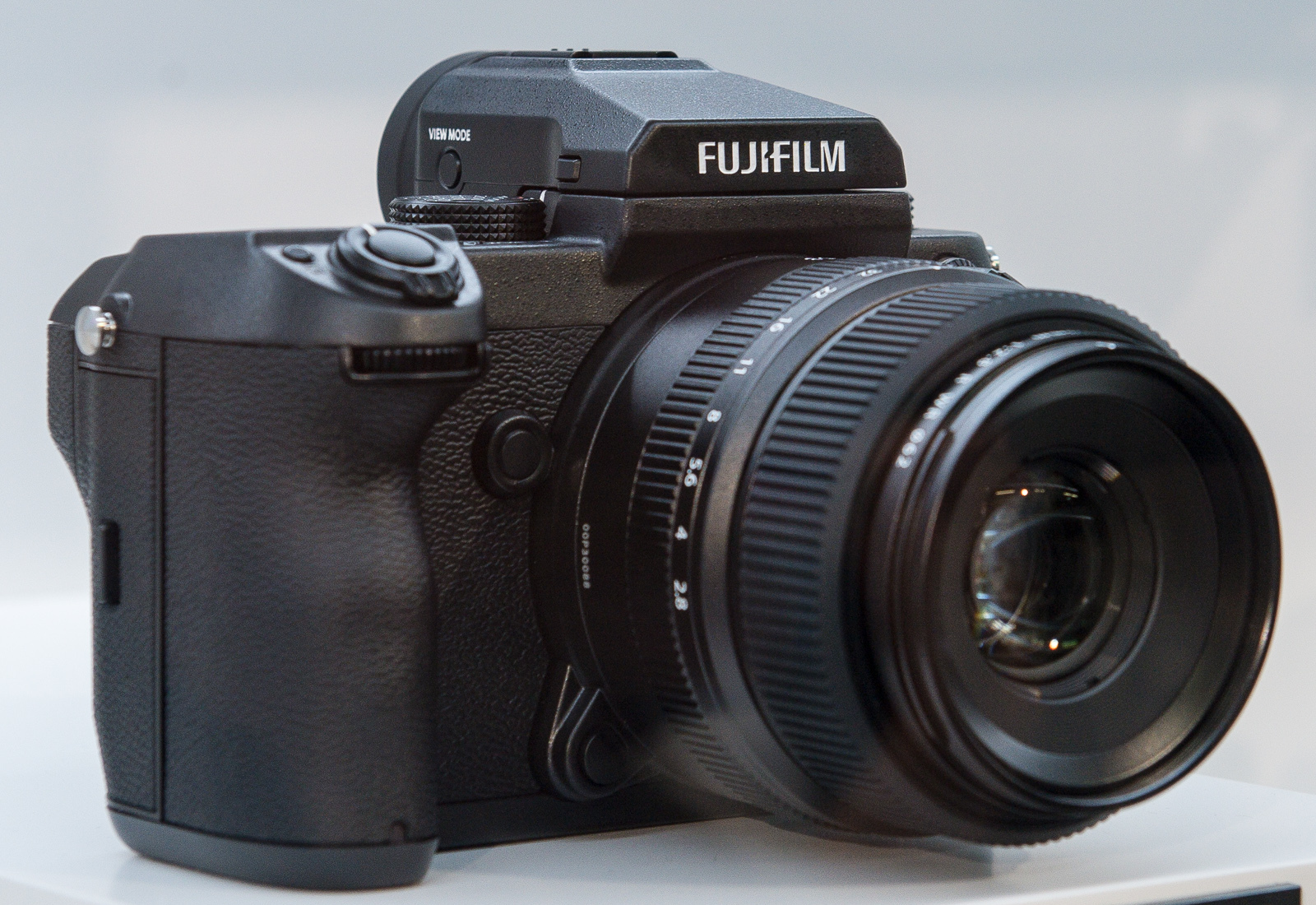
- Fujifilm GFX 50S

Overview
- Maker: Fujifilm
- Type: Mirrorless Camera
- Released: January 19, 2017
- Intro price: USD 6,499 (body), (kit not offered)

Lens
- Lens mount: Fujifilm G
- Lens: Interchangeable lens

Sensor/medium
- Sensor type: CMOS with Bayer filter
- Sensor size: 43.8 mm x 32.9 mm (Medium format)
- Maximum resolution: 8256 x 6192 (51.4 megapixels)
- Film speed: 100–12800 (standard); 50–102400 (extend)
- Recording medium: SD, SDHC, SDXC (UHS-II)
- Storage media: SD card

Focusing
- Focus: Intelligent Hybrid TTL contrast detection / Phase detection
- Focus modes: Single point, Zone, Wide/Tracking
- Focus areas: 91 focus point
- Focus bracketing: Interval, Number of shots, 10 step

Exposure/metering
- Exposure: TTL 256-zones metering
- Exposure modes: Program, Aperture Priority, Shutter Speed Priority, Manual Exposure
- Metering modes: Multi, Spot, Average

Flash
- Flash: External Flash
- Flash synchronization: 1/250 s
- Flash bracketing: ±1/3EV - ±3EV, 1/3EV
- Compatible flashes: Dedicated TTL Flash compatible

Shutter
- Shutter: Focal Plane Shutter
- Shutter speeds: 4 s to 1/4000 s (mechanical), 4 s to 1/6000 s (electronic)
- Continuous shooting: 6 frames per second

Viewfinder
- Viewfinder: 0.5 inches 3.69M dots OLED
- Viewfinder magnification: 0.85
- Frame coverage: 100%

Image processing
- Image processor: X-Processor Pro
- White balance: Auto, Custom, Preset, Fluorescent, Incandescent, Underwater
- WB bracketing: ±1, ±2, ±3
- Dynamic range bracketing: 100%, 200%, 400%

General
- Video recording: MP4 / MOV; 1080p up to 30 fps
- LCD screen: 3.2 inches 2.36M dots Tilt touchscreen
- Battery: NP-T125 Li-ion
- AV port(s): 3.5 mm and 2.5 mm audio jack, HDMI D
- Data port(s): USB 3.0, Wi-Fi 4, Bluetooth 4.2
- Body features: Ultra Sonic Vibration Sensor Cleaning system
- Dimensions: 147.5 mm × 94.2 mm × 91.4 mm (5.81 in × 3.71 in × 3.60 in)
- Weight: 825 g (29 oz) (1.819 lb) including battery and memory card
- Made in: Japan

Chronology
- Predecessor: Fujifilm GFX 50R

The Fujifilm GFX 50S is a mirrorless medium format camera produced by Fujifilm. It was the first camera featuring the Fujifilm G-mount. The camera was announced by Fujifilm during the photokina 2016 exhibition in Cologne, Germany, and production began at the start of 2017. The camera was available for sale from February 28, 2017.

It is the second mirrorless medium format camera ever produced and the first one with the shutter attached to the body and not to the attached lenses (focal plane shutter).

The camera's 43.8x32.9 mm^{2} sensor is 1.7x larger in area than that of 35 mm, built by Sony and customised by Fujifilm. The crop factor compared to the 35 mm format as a reference is 0.79. The camera's lens mount is the Fujifilm G-mount. GFX 50S jointly won a Camera Grand Prix Japan 2017 Editors Award.

The GFX50S II and the GFX 50R succeeds the GFX 50S. The GFX50S II was announced on September 2, 2021 and the GFX 50R was announced on September 25, 2018.

== See also ==
- Fujifilm GFX100
- Fujifilm G-mount

Type	Lens	2011	2012	2013	2014	2015	2016	2017	2018	2019	2020	2021	2022	2023	2024	2025
MILC	G-mount; Medium format sensor							GFX 50S ^{F} ^{T}					GFX 50S II ^{F} ^{T}			
MILC	G-mount; Medium format sensor									GFX 50R ^{F} ^{T}						
MILC	G-mount; Medium format sensor										GFX 100 ^{F} ^{T}					GFX 100 II ^{F} ^{T}
MILC	G-mount; Medium format sensor											GFX 100 IR ^{F} ^{T}				
MILC	G-mount; Medium format sensor											GFX 100S ^{F} ^{T}				GFX 100S II^{F} ^{T}
MILC	G-mount; Medium format sensor															GFX Eterna 55^{F} ^{T}
MILC	Prime lens Medium format sensor															GFX 100RF ^{F} ^{T}
MILC	X-mount; APS-C sensor		X-Pro1				X-Pro2				X-Pro3 ^{f} ^{T}					
MILC	X-mount; APS-C sensor								X-H1 ^{F} ^{T}					X-H2 ^{A} ^{T}		
MILC	X-mount; APS-C sensor													X-H2S ^{A} ^{T}		
MILC	X-mount; APS-C sensor											X-S10 ^{A} ^{T}			X-S20 ^{A} ^{T}	
MILC	X-mount; APS-C sensor				X-T1 ^{f}			X-T2 ^{F}		X-T3 ^{F} ^{T}		X-T4 ^{A} ^{T}		X-T5 ^{F} ^{T}		
MILC	X-mount; APS-C sensor						X-T10 ^{f}	X-T20 ^{f} ^{T}		X-T30 ^{f} ^{T}			X-T30 II ^{f} ^{T}			X-T50 ^{f} ^{T}
MILC	X-mount; APS-C sensor									_{15} X-T100 ^{F} ^{T}	X-T200 ^{A} ^{T}					
MILC	X-mount; APS-C sensor			X-E1	X-E2		X-E2s		X-E3 ^{T}			X-E4 ^{f} ^{T}				X-E5 ^{f} ^{T}
MILC	X-mount; APS-C sensor				X-M1 ^{f}											X-M5 ^{A} ^{T}
MILC	X-mount; APS-C sensor				X-A1 ^{f}	X-A2 ^{f}		X-A3 ^{f} ^{T}	_{15} X-A5 ^{f} ^{T}		X-A7 ^{A} ^{T}					
MILC	X-mount; APS-C sensor							X-A10 ^{f}	X-A20 ^{f} ^{T}							
Compact	Prime lens APS-C sensor	X100		X100S		X100T		X100F			X100V ^{f} ^{T}				X100VI ^{f} ^{T}	
Compact	Prime lens APS-C sensor						X70 ^{f} ^{T}			XF10 ^{T}						
Compact	Prime lens 1" sensor															X half ^{T}
Compact	Zoom lens^{2}/_{3}" sensor		X10	X20		X30 ^{f}										
Compact	Zoom lens^{2}/_{3}" sensor				XQ1	XQ2										
Compact	Zoom lens^{2}/_{3}" sensor			XF1												
Bridge	^{2}/_{3}" sensor		X-S1 ^{f}													
Type	Lens															
Type	Lens	2011	2012	2013	2014	2015	2016	2017	2018	2019	2020	2021	2022	2023	2024	2025
